This is a partial list of unnumbered minor planets for principal provisional designations assigned between 1 January and 15 March 2003. , a total of 531 bodies remain unnumbered for this period. Objects for this year are listed on the following pages: A–E · F–G · H–L · M–R · Si · Sii · Siii · Siv · T · Ui · Uii · Uiii · Uiv · V · Wi · Wii and X–Y. Also see previous and next year.

A 

|- id="2003 AC1" bgcolor=#FFC2E0
| 5 ||  || AMO || 20.7 || data-sort-value="0.26" | 260 m || single || 87 days || 29 Mar 2003 || 55 || align=left | Disc.: LINEAR || 
|- id="2003 AY2" bgcolor=#FFC2E0
| 1 ||  || APO || 19.3 || data-sort-value="0.49" | 490 m || multiple || 2002–2019 || 02 Dec 2019 || 84 || align=left | Disc.: LONEOSPotentially hazardous object || 
|- id="2003 AA3" bgcolor=#FFC2E0
| 0 ||  || APO || 20.2 || data-sort-value="0.32" | 320 m || multiple || 2003–2020 || 20 May 2020 || 327 || align=left | Disc.: LINEARPotentially hazardous objectAMO at MPC || 
|- id="2003 AM4" bgcolor=#FFC2E0
| 0 ||  || AMO || 21.22 || data-sort-value="0.20" | 200 m || multiple || 2002–2021 || 10 Jan 2021 || 71 || align=left | Disc.: LINEAR || 
|- id="2003 AU4" bgcolor=#d6d6d6
| 1 ||  || MBA-O || 17.39 || 1.9 km || multiple || 2003–2021 || 28 Sep 2021 || 47 || align=left | Disc.: VATT || 
|- id="2003 AQ8" bgcolor=#fefefe
| 0 ||  || MBA-I || 17.5 || data-sort-value="0.94" | 940 m || multiple || 2002–2021 || 18 Jan 2021 || 122 || align=left | Disc.: Tenagra II Obs.Alt.: 2014 GZ32, 2015 NC12 || 
|- id="2003 AP9" bgcolor=#E9E9E9
| 1 ||  || MBA-M || 18.5 || data-sort-value="0.84" | 840 m || multiple || 2003–2020 || 31 Jan 2020 || 61 || align=left | Disc.: LPL/Spacewatch II || 
|- id="2003 AS9" bgcolor=#d6d6d6
| 0 ||  || MBA-O || 16.47 || 2.8 km || multiple || 2003–2021 || 19 May 2021 || 109 || align=left | Disc.: LPL/Spacewatch IIAlt.: 2010 DF65 || 
|- id="2003 AN15" bgcolor=#E9E9E9
| 0 ||  || MBA-M || 16.9 || 1.7 km || multiple || 2003–2020 || 12 Apr 2020 || 163 || align=left | Disc.: LINEARAlt.: 2010 PA21 || 
|- id="2003 AZ16" bgcolor=#fefefe
| 0 ||  || MBA-I || 17.7 || data-sort-value="0.86" | 860 m || multiple || 2003–2021 || 17 Jan 2021 || 140 || align=left | Disc.: LINEARAlt.: 2010 CQ210 || 
|- id="2003 AH22" bgcolor=#fefefe
| 0 ||  || MBA-I || 17.14 || 1.1 km || multiple || 2003–2021 || 20 Apr 2021 || 170 || align=left | Disc.: LINEAR || 
|- id="2003 AY22" bgcolor=#fefefe
| 0 ||  || HUN || 17.5 || data-sort-value="0.94" | 940 m || multiple || 2002–2020 || 27 Dec 2020 || 211 || align=left | Disc.: LINEARAlt.: 2012 SZ21, 2015 YO || 
|- id="2003 AB23" bgcolor=#FFC2E0
| 1 ||  || APO || 19.9 || data-sort-value="0.37" | 370 m || multiple || 2002–2009 || 23 Feb 2009 || 80 || align=left | Disc.: LINEAR || 
|- id="2003 AC23" bgcolor=#FFC2E0
| 1 ||  || APO || 21.9 || data-sort-value="0.15" | 150 m || multiple || 2003–2019 || 20 Jan 2019 || 85 || align=left | Disc.: LINEARPotentially hazardous object || 
|- id="2003 AF23" bgcolor=#FFC2E0
| 0 ||  || ATE || 21.02 || data-sort-value="0.22" | 220 m || multiple || 2003–2021 || 23 Feb 2021 || 460 || align=left | Disc.: LINEARPotentially hazardous object || 
|- id="2003 AP37" bgcolor=#FA8072
| 0 ||  || MCA || 17.7 || 1.6 km || multiple || 2002–2021 || 19 Jan 2021 || 235 || align=left | Disc.: LINEAR || 
|- id="2003 AB39" bgcolor=#d6d6d6
| 0 ||  || MBA-O || 16.2 || 3.2 km || multiple || 2002–2020 || 18 May 2020 || 93 || align=left | Disc.: LINEARAlt.: 2013 YC148 || 
|- id="2003 AJ42" bgcolor=#FA8072
| – ||  || MCA || 18.2 || data-sort-value="0.68" | 680 m || single || 27 days || 03 Feb 2003 || 17 || align=left | Disc.: LINEAR || 
|- id="2003 AS42" bgcolor=#FFC2E0
| 8 ||  || APO || 25.3 || data-sort-value="0.031" | 31 m || single || 3 days || 11 Jan 2003 || 36 || align=left | Disc.: LINEAR || 
|- id="2003 AH51" bgcolor=#d6d6d6
| 0 ||  || MBA-O || 15.8 || 3.9 km || multiple || 1995–2020 || 18 Apr 2020 || 140 || align=left | Disc.: LINEARAlt.: 2012 TE215 || 
|- id="2003 AU63" bgcolor=#fefefe
| 0 ||  || MBA-I || 17.2 || 1.1 km || multiple || 2003–2021 || 04 Jan 2021 || 120 || align=left | Disc.: LINEARAlt.: 2016 TB31 || 
|- id="2003 AJ69" bgcolor=#FFC2E0
| 7 ||  || APO || 24.9 || data-sort-value="0.037" | 37 m || single || 13 days || 23 Jan 2003 || 31 || align=left | Disc.: LINEAR || 
|- id="2003 AE71" bgcolor=#d6d6d6
| – ||  || MBA-O || 18.2 || 1.3 km || single || 3 days || 13 Jan 2003 || 15 || align=left | Disc.: LPL/Spacewatch II || 
|- id="2003 AG71" bgcolor=#E9E9E9
| 0 ||  || MBA-M || 17.59 || data-sort-value="0.90" | 900 m || multiple || 2003–2021 || 08 Sep 2021 || 132 || align=left | Disc.: LPL/Spacewatch II || 
|- id="2003 AN71" bgcolor=#fefefe
| 0 ||  || MBA-I || 18.56 || data-sort-value="0.58" | 580 m || multiple || 2003–2021 || 04 Apr 2021 || 59 || align=left | Disc.: LPL/Spacewatch IIAlt.: 2017 AJ16 || 
|- id="2003 AP71" bgcolor=#FA8072
| 0 ||  || MCA || 18.23 || data-sort-value="0.67" | 670 m || multiple || 2002–2022 || 07 Jan 2022 || 86 || align=left | Disc.: LINEAR || 
|- id="2003 AU72" bgcolor=#fefefe
| 2 ||  || MBA-I || 18.2 || data-sort-value="0.68" | 680 m || multiple || 2003–2017 || 26 Apr 2017 || 45 || align=left | Disc.: LINEAR || 
|- id="2003 AK73" bgcolor=#FFC2E0
| 3 ||  || APO || 19.5 || data-sort-value="0.45" | 450 m || multiple || 2003–2007 || 26 Jan 2007 || 49 || align=left | Disc.: NEAT || 
|- id="2003 AE79" bgcolor=#E9E9E9
| 0 ||  || MBA-M || 16.8 || 1.3 km || multiple || 2001–2020 || 27 Feb 2020 || 106 || align=left | Disc.: LPL/Spacewatch II || 
|- id="2003 AA83" bgcolor=#FFC2E0
| – ||  || APO || 22.8 || data-sort-value="0.098" | 98 m || single || 6 days || 19 Jan 2003 || 20 || align=left | Disc.: LINEAR || 
|- id="2003 AD83" bgcolor=#d6d6d6
| 0 ||  || MBA-O || 16.90 || 2.3 km || multiple || 2003–2021 || 08 Apr 2021 || 49 || align=left | Disc.: Kitt Peak Obs.Alt.: 2015 DO188 || 
|- id="2003 AF83" bgcolor=#E9E9E9
| 0 ||  || MBA-M || 17.80 || data-sort-value="0.82" | 820 m || multiple || 2003–2021 || 10 Aug 2021 || 91 || align=left | Disc.: Kitt Peak Obs.Alt.: 2014 YS1 || 
|- id="2003 AJ83" bgcolor=#d6d6d6
| 0 ||  || MBA-O || 16.7 || 2.5 km || multiple || 2003–2021 || 01 Jun 2021 || 33 || align=left | Disc.: Kitt Peak Obs. || 
|- id="2003 AP83" bgcolor=#E9E9E9
| 1 ||  || MBA-M || 18.1 || 1.0 km || multiple || 2003–2020 || 23 Jan 2020 || 96 || align=left | Disc.: Kitt Peak Obs.Alt.: 2006 XP || 
|- id="2003 AR83" bgcolor=#E9E9E9
| – ||  || MBA-M || 18.5 || data-sort-value="0.84" | 840 m || single || 2 days || 06 Jan 2003 || 14 || align=left | Disc.: Kitt Peak Obs. || 
|- id="2003 AS83" bgcolor=#d6d6d6
| 0 ||  || MBA-O || 17.0 || 2.2 km || multiple || 2003–2020 || 15 Sep 2020 || 57 || align=left | Disc.: Kitt Peak Obs.Added on 13 September 2020Alt.: 2011 UL379, 2016 XD3 || 
|- id="2003 AT83" bgcolor=#d6d6d6
| 0 ||  || MBA-O || 16.13 || 3.3 km || multiple || 2003–2021 || 16 Apr 2021 || 87 || align=left | Disc.: Kitt Peak Obs. || 
|- id="2003 AW83" bgcolor=#d6d6d6
| 1 ||  || MBA-O || 18.4 || 1.2 km || multiple || 2003–2021 || 06 Nov 2021 || 31 || align=left | Disc.: Kitt Peak Obs. || 
|- id="2003 AO85" bgcolor=#fefefe
| 0 ||  || MBA-I || 17.54 || data-sort-value="0.92" | 920 m || multiple || 2003–2021 || 01 Nov 2021 || 83 || align=left | Disc.: LINEARAdded on 30 September 2021 || 
|- id="2003 AO90" bgcolor=#fefefe
| 0 ||  || MBA-I || 17.31 || 1.0 km || multiple || 2003–2022 || 19 Jan 2022 || 102 || align=left | Disc.: LINEARAlt.: 2007 DG104, 2010 AV81, 2018 EA3 || 
|- id="2003 AA93" bgcolor=#fefefe
| – ||  || MBA-I || 19.1 || data-sort-value="0.45" | 450 m || single || 3 days || 04 Jan 2003 || 23 || align=left | Disc.: La Silla Obs. || 
|- id="2003 AE93" bgcolor=#E9E9E9
| – ||  || MBA-M || 18.8 || data-sort-value="0.73" | 730 m || single || 2 days || 03 Jan 2003 || 9 || align=left | Disc.: La Silla Obs. || 
|- id="2003 AF93" bgcolor=#d6d6d6
| 0 ||  || MBA-O || 16.5 || 2.8 km || multiple || 2003–2021 || 15 Jan 2021 || 62 || align=left | Disc.: La Silla Obs. || 
|- id="2003 AJ93" bgcolor=#E9E9E9
| 0 ||  || MBA-M || 17.1 || 2.1 km || multiple || 2003–2020 || 19 Jul 2020 || 66 || align=left | Disc.: La Silla Obs. || 
|- id="2003 AM93" bgcolor=#d6d6d6
| 0 ||  || MBA-O || 16.9 || 2.3 km || multiple || 2003–2021 || 07 Jul 2021 || 98 || align=left | Disc.: La Silla Obs.Added on 11 May 2021Alt.: 2010 KP80 || 
|- id="2003 AQ93" bgcolor=#d6d6d6
| 0 ||  || MBA-O || 17.16 || 2.1 km || multiple || 2003–2021 || 14 Apr 2021 || 50 || align=left | Disc.: La Silla Obs. || 
|- id="2003 AR93" bgcolor=#C2FFFF
| – ||  || JT || 15.7 || 4.0 km || single || 3 days || 04 Jan 2003 || 12 || align=left | Disc.: La Silla Obs.Trojan camp (L5) || 
|- id="2003 AS93" bgcolor=#d6d6d6
| – ||  || MBA-O || 18.7 || 1.0 km || single || 2 days || 03 Jan 2003 || 10 || align=left | Disc.: La Silla Obs. || 
|- id="2003 AZ94" bgcolor=#E9E9E9
| 0 ||  || MBA-M || 17.36 || 1.4 km || multiple || 2003–2021 || 14 Apr 2021 || 117 || align=left | Disc.: NEAT || 
|- id="2003 AB95" bgcolor=#d6d6d6
| 0 ||  || MBA-O || 16.6 || 2.7 km || multiple || 2003–2020 || 27 Apr 2020 || 86 || align=left | Disc.: LPL/Spacewatch II || 
|- id="2003 AD95" bgcolor=#fefefe
| 0 ||  || MBA-I || 18.64 || data-sort-value="0.56" | 560 m || multiple || 2003–2022 || 27 Jan 2022 || 66 || align=left | Disc.: LPL/Spacewatch II || 
|- id="2003 AE95" bgcolor=#d6d6d6
| 0 ||  || MBA-O || 17.07 || 2.1 km || multiple || 2003–2021 || 06 Sep 2021 || 154 || align=left | Disc.: LPL/Spacewatch II || 
|- id="2003 AF95" bgcolor=#fefefe
| 0 ||  || MBA-I || 18.6 || data-sort-value="0.57" | 570 m || multiple || 2003–2020 || 25 Mar 2020 || 51 || align=left | Disc.: LPL/Spacewatch II || 
|- id="2003 AG95" bgcolor=#d6d6d6
| 0 ||  || MBA-O || 17.42 || 1.8 km || multiple || 2003–2021 || 11 Sep 2021 || 39 || align=left | Disc.: LPL/Spacewatch II || 
|- id="2003 AH95" bgcolor=#fefefe
| 0 ||  || MBA-I || 17.7 || data-sort-value="0.86" | 860 m || multiple || 2003–2020 || 16 Nov 2020 || 124 || align=left | Disc.: LPL/Spacewatch II || 
|- id="2003 AJ95" bgcolor=#fefefe
| 0 ||  || MBA-I || 18.0 || data-sort-value="0.75" | 750 m || multiple || 2003–2020 || 23 Oct 2020 || 73 || align=left | Disc.: LPL/Spacewatch II || 
|- id="2003 AK95" bgcolor=#E9E9E9
| 0 ||  || MBA-M || 17.4 || 1.8 km || multiple || 2003–2021 || 23 Jan 2021 || 66 || align=left | Disc.: LPL/Spacewatch II || 
|- id="2003 AM95" bgcolor=#E9E9E9
| 0 ||  || MBA-M || 17.2 || 2.0 km || multiple || 2003–2020 || 16 Dec 2020 || 64 || align=left | Disc.: LPL/Spacewatch II || 
|- id="2003 AN95" bgcolor=#d6d6d6
| 0 ||  || MBA-O || 16.7 || 2.5 km || multiple || 2003–2020 || 11 May 2020 || 49 || align=left | Disc.: LPL/Spacewatch II || 
|- id="2003 AO95" bgcolor=#d6d6d6
| 0 ||  || MBA-O || 17.44 || 1.8 km || multiple || 2003–2021 || 31 May 2021 || 44 || align=left | Disc.: Kitt Peak Obs. || 
|- id="2003 AP95" bgcolor=#fefefe
| 0 ||  || MBA-I || 18.98 || data-sort-value="0.48" | 480 m || multiple || 2003–2022 || 27 Jan 2022 || 26 || align=left | Disc.: LPL/Spacewatch II || 
|- id="2003 AQ95" bgcolor=#fefefe
| 0 ||  || MBA-I || 17.9 || data-sort-value="0.78" | 780 m || multiple || 2003–2021 || 15 Jan 2021 || 141 || align=left | Disc.: LPL/Spacewatch II || 
|- id="2003 AR95" bgcolor=#C2FFFF
| 0 ||  || JT || 14.13 || 8.3 km || multiple || 2000–2021 || 09 Jun 2021 || 129 || align=left | Disc.: LPL/Spacewatch IITrojan camp (L5) || 
|- id="2003 AS95" bgcolor=#d6d6d6
| 0 ||  || MBA-O || 16.61 || 2.7 km || multiple || 2003–2021 || 03 Dec 2021 || 109 || align=left | Disc.: LPL/Spacewatch II || 
|- id="2003 AT95" bgcolor=#d6d6d6
| 0 ||  || MBA-O || 17.36 || 1.9 km || multiple || 2003–2020 || 21 Jun 2020 || 61 || align=left | Disc.: LPL/Spacewatch II || 
|- id="2003 AU95" bgcolor=#d6d6d6
| 2 ||  || HIL || 16.6 || 2.7 km || multiple || 2003–2020 || 19 Apr 2020 || 28 || align=left | Disc.: LPL/Spacewatch II || 
|- id="2003 AV95" bgcolor=#fefefe
| 1 ||  || MBA-I || 18.5 || data-sort-value="0.59" | 590 m || multiple || 2003–2019 || 22 Aug 2019 || 47 || align=left | Disc.: LPL/Spacewatch II || 
|- id="2003 AW95" bgcolor=#d6d6d6
| 0 ||  || MBA-O || 16.24 || 3.1 km || multiple || 2003–2021 || 12 May 2021 || 105 || align=left | Disc.: Tenagra II Obs.Alt.: 2010 CU136 || 
|- id="2003 AX95" bgcolor=#d6d6d6
| 0 ||  || MBA-O || 17.2 || 2.0 km || multiple || 2003–2021 || 08 May 2021 || 53 || align=left | Disc.: Kitt Peak Obs.Added on 17 June 2021 || 
|}
back to top

B 

|- id="2003 BL" bgcolor=#FA8072
| 0 || 2003 BL || MCA || 16.48 || 2.8 km || multiple || 2003–2022 || 12 Jan 2022 || 96 || align=left | Disc.: LONEOS || 
|- id="2003 BK1" bgcolor=#FA8072
| – ||  || MCA || 18.5 || data-sort-value="0.84" | 840 m || single || 4 days || 26 Jan 2003 || 14 || align=left | Disc.: LINEAR || 
|- id="2003 BM1" bgcolor=#d6d6d6
| 1 ||  || MBA-O || 18.2 || 1.3 km || multiple || 2003–2017 || 05 Feb 2017 || 86 || align=left | Disc.: NEAT || 
|- id="2003 BN1" bgcolor=#FFC2E0
| – ||  || APO || 20.1 || data-sort-value="0.34" | 340 m || single || 8 days || 01 Feb 2003 || 84 || align=left | Disc.: LONEOS || 
|- id="2003 BS1" bgcolor=#d6d6d6
| 0 ||  || MBA-O || 16.0 || 3.5 km || multiple || 2002–2020 || 12 May 2020 || 105 || align=left | Disc.: Table Mountain Obs. || 
|- id="2003 BT1" bgcolor=#E9E9E9
| 1 ||  || MBA-M || 18.4 || data-sort-value="0.88" | 880 m || multiple || 2003–2020 || 22 Mar 2020 || 82 || align=left | Disc.: VATT || 
|- id="2003 BV1" bgcolor=#E9E9E9
| 0 ||  || MBA-M || 17.3 || 1.9 km || multiple || 2003–2021 || 11 Jan 2021 || 132 || align=left | Disc.: LPL/Spacewatch IIAlt.: 2017 BO132 || 
|- id="2003 BX2" bgcolor=#FA8072
| 0 ||  || MCA || 17.2 || 1.5 km || multiple || 2003–2020 || 22 May 2020 || 158 || align=left | Disc.: LINEARAlt.: 2006 UC184 || 
|- id="2003 BB3" bgcolor=#fefefe
| 0 ||  || HUN || 18.50 || data-sort-value="0.59" | 590 m || multiple || 2003–2022 || 27 Jan 2022 || 67 || align=left | Disc.: NEATAlt.: 2014 GJ34 || 
|- id="2003 BK3" bgcolor=#fefefe
| 0 ||  || MBA-I || 17.9 || data-sort-value="0.78" | 780 m || multiple || 2003–2021 || 18 Jan 2021 || 58 || align=left | Disc.: La Silla Obs. || 
|- id="2003 BM3" bgcolor=#E9E9E9
| 0 ||  || MBA-M || 17.6 || 1.7 km || multiple || 2003–2021 || 05 Feb 2021 || 89 || align=left | Disc.: La Silla Obs.Alt.: 2017 FA139 || 
|- id="2003 BP3" bgcolor=#E9E9E9
| 0 ||  || MBA-M || 17.81 || 1.2 km || multiple || 1994–2021 || 14 Apr 2021 || 48 || align=left | Disc.: La Silla Obs. || 
|- id="2003 BQ3" bgcolor=#d6d6d6
| 0 ||  || MBA-O || 16.88 || 2.3 km || multiple || 2003–2021 || 08 May 2021 || 60 || align=left | Disc.: La Silla Obs. || 
|- id="2003 BS3" bgcolor=#fefefe
| 0 ||  || MBA-I || 18.4 || data-sort-value="0.62" | 620 m || multiple || 2003–2020 || 24 Oct 2020 || 45 || align=left | Disc.: La Silla Obs. || 
|- id="2003 BV3" bgcolor=#E9E9E9
| 0 ||  || MBA-M || 17.08 || 1.6 km || multiple || 2001–2021 || 07 Jul 2021 || 218 || align=left | Disc.: La Silla Obs.Alt.: 2005 RZ16, 2012 DO24, 2014 XX21 || 
|- id="2003 BX3" bgcolor=#fefefe
| 0 ||  || MBA-I || 18.46 || data-sort-value="0.60" | 600 m || multiple || 2000–2021 || 11 May 2021 || 105 || align=left | Disc.: La Silla Obs.Alt.: 2014 HC20 || 
|- id="2003 BC4" bgcolor=#d6d6d6
| 0 ||  || MBA-O || 16.90 || 2.3 km || multiple || 2003–2021 || 07 Jul 2021 || 56 || align=left | Disc.: La Silla Obs. || 
|- id="2003 BM4" bgcolor=#FFC2E0
| 6 ||  || APO || 25.1 || data-sort-value="0.034" | 34 m || single || 7 days || 02 Feb 2003 || 43 || align=left | Disc.: LONEOS || 
|- id="2003 BN4" bgcolor=#FFC2E0
| 1 ||  || AMO || 24.0 || data-sort-value="0.056" | 56 m || multiple || 2002–2013 || 26 Feb 2013 || 102 || align=left | Disc.: LPL/Spacewatch II || 
|- id="2003 BV4" bgcolor=#d6d6d6
| 0 ||  || MBA-O || 16.64 || 2.6 km || multiple || 2003–2021 || 14 Apr 2021 || 52 || align=left | Disc.: La Silla Obs. || 
|- id="2003 BA5" bgcolor=#E9E9E9
| 0 ||  || MBA-M || 18.5 || data-sort-value="0.84" | 840 m || multiple || 1999–2020 || 23 Mar 2020 || 70 || align=left | Disc.: La Silla Obs.Alt.: 2016 EL163 || 
|- id="2003 BH5" bgcolor=#E9E9E9
| 0 ||  || MBA-M || 17.2 || 2.0 km || multiple || 2003–2021 || 12 Jan 2021 || 68 || align=left | Disc.: La Silla Obs.Alt.: 2014 QF298 || 
|- id="2003 BK5" bgcolor=#d6d6d6
| 0 ||  || MBA-O || 17.5 || 1.8 km || multiple || 2001–2020 || 13 Sep 2020 || 64 || align=left | Disc.: La Silla Obs.Alt.: 2013 ER60 || 
|- id="2003 BL5" bgcolor=#E9E9E9
| 0 ||  || MBA-M || 17.15 || 1.6 km || multiple || 2001–2021 || 03 May 2021 || 135 || align=left | Disc.: La Silla Obs.Alt.: 2014 OH296, 2016 AB139 || 
|- id="2003 BR5" bgcolor=#E9E9E9
| 0 ||  || MBA-M || 17.6 || 1.3 km || multiple || 2003–2019 || 24 Dec 2019 || 51 || align=left | Disc.: La Silla Obs. || 
|- id="2003 BT5" bgcolor=#E9E9E9
| 0 ||  || MBA-M || 17.67 || 1.2 km || multiple || 2003–2021 || 08 May 2021 || 52 || align=left | Disc.: La Silla Obs. || 
|- id="2003 BW5" bgcolor=#E9E9E9
| 0 ||  || MBA-M || 16.69 || 2.6 km || multiple || 2003–2021 || 01 Apr 2021 || 163 || align=left | Disc.: LONEOSAlt.: 2012 BR95 || 
|- id="2003 BY6" bgcolor=#fefefe
| 0 ||  || MBA-I || 17.5 || data-sort-value="0.94" | 940 m || multiple || 2003–2021 || 08 Jan 2021 || 45 || align=left | Disc.: LONEOS || 
|- id="2003 BE8" bgcolor=#d6d6d6
| 0 ||  || MBA-O || 16.5 || 2.8 km || multiple || 2001–2020 || 21 May 2020 || 96 || align=left | Disc.: LONEOS || 
|- id="2003 BS9" bgcolor=#d6d6d6
| 0 ||  || MBA-O || 16.5 || 2.8 km || multiple || 2003–2020 || 19 Apr 2020 || 76 || align=left | Disc.: NEAT || 
|- id="2003 BE15" bgcolor=#fefefe
| 0 ||  || MBA-I || 16.8 || 1.3 km || multiple || 2003–2021 || 12 Jan 2021 || 311 || align=left | Disc.: AMOS || 
|- id="2003 BL15" bgcolor=#E9E9E9
| 0 ||  || MBA-M || 17.75 || 1.6 km || multiple || 2003–2021 || 09 May 2021 || 200 || align=left | Disc.: AMOS || 
|- id="2003 BY20" bgcolor=#E9E9E9
| – ||  || MBA-M || 17.5 || 1.8 km || single || 5 days || 01 Feb 2003 || 17 || align=left | Disc.: VATT || 
|- id="2003 BB21" bgcolor=#FFC2E0
| 1 ||  || APO || 20.9 || data-sort-value="0.23" | 230 m || multiple || 2003–2013 || 28 Mar 2013 || 115 || align=left | Disc.: LINEARPotentially hazardous object || 
|- id="2003 BX21" bgcolor=#E9E9E9
| 1 ||  || MBA-M || 17.9 || 1.5 km || multiple || 2003–2021 || 14 Jan 2021 || 83 || align=left | Disc.: LINEARAlt.: 2011 YR14 || 
|- id="2003 BA23" bgcolor=#d6d6d6
| 2 ||  || MBA-O || 16.9 || 2.3 km || multiple || 2003–2019 || 04 Apr 2019 || 37 || align=left | Disc.: NEAT || 
|- id="2003 BC23" bgcolor=#d6d6d6
| 0 ||  || MBA-O || 16.27 || 3.1 km || multiple || 2002–2021 || 10 Jul 2021 || 149 || align=left | Disc.: NEAT || 
|- id="2003 BP23" bgcolor=#E9E9E9
| 0 ||  || MBA-M || 16.40 || 2.9 km || multiple || 2003–2021 || 09 May 2021 || 292 || align=left | Disc.: NEATAlt.: 2012 BD87 || 
|- id="2003 BM33" bgcolor=#d6d6d6
| 0 ||  || MBA-O || 15.5 || 4.4 km || multiple || 1994–2020 || 26 May 2020 || 190 || align=left | Disc.: AMOSAlt.: 2013 YV96 || 
|- id="2003 BW33" bgcolor=#FFC2E0
| 7 ||  || APO || 21.3 || data-sort-value="0.20" | 200 m || single || 46 days || 14 Mar 2003 || 41 || align=left | Disc.: LINEAR || 
|- id="2003 BD34" bgcolor=#d6d6d6
| 0 ||  || MBA-O || 16.0 || 3.5 km || multiple || 2003–2021 || 06 Jun 2021 || 189 || align=left | Disc.: La Silla Obs.Alt.: 2015 GT26 || 
|- id="2003 BG34" bgcolor=#fefefe
| – ||  || MBA-I || 19.1 || data-sort-value="0.45" | 450 m || single || 5 days || 01 Feb 2003 || 12 || align=left | Disc.: VATT || 
|- id="2003 BR35" bgcolor=#FA8072
| 1 ||  || MCA || 17.9 || data-sort-value="0.78" | 780 m || multiple || 2003–2019 || 02 Dec 2019 || 255 || align=left | Disc.: LINEAR || 
|- id="2003 BS35" bgcolor=#FFC2E0
| 7 ||  || APO || 24.7 || data-sort-value="0.041" | 41 m || single || 11 days || 07 Feb 2003 || 13 || align=left | Disc.: AMOS || 
|- id="2003 BV35" bgcolor=#FFC2E0
| 7 ||  || APO || 22.1 || data-sort-value="0.14" | 140 m || single || 11 days || 09 Feb 2003 || 118 || align=left | Disc.: Table Mountain Obs. || 
|- id="2003 BW37" bgcolor=#E9E9E9
| 1 ||  || MBA-M || 18.4 || data-sort-value="0.88" | 880 m || multiple || 2003–2020 || 26 Jan 2020 || 28 || align=left | Disc.: LPL/Spacewatch IIAlt.: 2016 CC53 || 
|- id="2003 BW39" bgcolor=#E9E9E9
| 0 ||  = (349067) || MBA-M || 17.18 || 1.5 km || multiple || 2006-2021 || 11 Jun 2021 || 246 || align=left | Disc.: NEATAlt.: 2006 XS63 || 
|- id="2003 BY39" bgcolor=#fefefe
| 0 ||  || MBA-I || 18.51 || data-sort-value="0.59" | 590 m || multiple || 2001–2022 || 26 Jan 2022 || 79 || align=left | Disc.: LPL/Spacewatch II || 
|- id="2003 BK41" bgcolor=#E9E9E9
| 0 ||  || MBA-M || 17.3 || 1.9 km || multiple || 2003–2021 || 18 Jan 2021 || 132 || align=left | Disc.: LPL/Spacewatch IIAlt.: 2008 EN131, 2014 OZ144, 2015 XG22 || 
|- id="2003 BQ41" bgcolor=#fefefe
| 0 ||  || MBA-I || 17.7 || data-sort-value="0.86" | 860 m || multiple || 2003–2021 || 18 Jan 2021 || 102 || align=left | Disc.: LPL/Spacewatch IIAlt.: 2014 DF174 || 
|- id="2003 BR41" bgcolor=#d6d6d6
| 2 ||  || MBA-O || 17.5 || 1.8 km || multiple || 2003–2020 || 02 Feb 2020 || 32 || align=left | Disc.: LPL/Spacewatch II || 
|- id="2003 BQ42" bgcolor=#E9E9E9
| 0 ||  || MBA-M || 16.8 || 1.8 km || multiple || 2003–2020 || 24 Mar 2020 || 187 || align=left | Disc.: AMOS || 
|- id="2003 BA43" bgcolor=#FA8072
| 1 ||  || MCA || 17.6 || 1.3 km || multiple || 2003–2019 || 02 Nov 2019 || 96 || align=left | Disc.: AMOS || 
|- id="2003 BD43" bgcolor=#fefefe
| E ||  || MBA-I || 18.3 || data-sort-value="0.65" | 650 m || single || 4 days || 01 Feb 2003 || 11 || align=left | Disc.: VATT || 
|- id="2003 BW43" bgcolor=#E9E9E9
| 0 ||  || MBA-M || 17.4 || 1.4 km || multiple || 2003–2020 || 22 Apr 2020 || 148 || align=left | Disc.: LINEAR || 
|- id="2003 BC44" bgcolor=#FFC2E0
| 7 ||  || APO || 25.5 || data-sort-value="0.028" | 28 m || single || 2 days || 31 Jan 2003 || 9 || align=left | Disc.: LPL/Spacewatch II || 
|- id="2003 BT45" bgcolor=#d6d6d6
| 0 ||  || MBA-O || 16.48 || 2.8 km || multiple || 2003–2021 || 29 Jul 2021 || 122 || align=left | Disc.: AMOS || 
|- id="2003 BB46" bgcolor=#FA8072
| 2 ||  || MCA || 18.3 || data-sort-value="0.65" | 650 m || multiple || 2003–2020 || 08 Aug 2020 || 74 || align=left | Disc.: LPL/Spacewatch II || 
|- id="2003 BC46" bgcolor=#FFC2E0
| 4 ||  || AMO || 23.6 || data-sort-value="0.068" | 68 m || single || 89 days || 24 Apr 2003 || 27 || align=left | Disc.: La Silla Obs. || 
|- id="2003 BK46" bgcolor=#fefefe
| 0 ||  || HUN || 18.26 || data-sort-value="0.66" | 660 m || multiple || 2003–2022 || 25 Jan 2022 || 62 || align=left | Disc.: LINEAR || 
|- id="2003 BU46" bgcolor=#E9E9E9
| 0 ||  || MBA-M || 17.38 || 1.4 km || multiple || 2003–2021 || 09 Apr 2021 || 58 || align=left | Disc.: AMOSAlt.: 2015 TJ24 || 
|- id="2003 BC47" bgcolor=#E9E9E9
| 0 ||  || MBA-M || 16.3 || 2.3 km || multiple || 2003–2021 || 03 Jun 2021 || 227 || align=left | Disc.: NEATAlt.: 2014 QM294, 2016 AW36 || 
|- id="2003 BK47" bgcolor=#FFC2E0
| 0 ||  || APO || 17.8 || data-sort-value="0.98" | 980 m || multiple || 2003–2021 || 24 Jan 2021 || 593 || align=left | Disc.: LPL/Spacewatch IIPotentially hazardous objectNEO larger than 1 kilometer || 
|- id="2003 BL47" bgcolor=#FA8072
| 2 ||  || MCA || 17.2 || 1.1 km || multiple || 1999–2020 || 26 Jan 2020 || 32 || align=left | Disc.: LINEARAlt.: 1999 CA11 || 
|- id="2003 BR47" bgcolor=#FFC2E0
| 2 ||  || APO || 21.4 || data-sort-value="0.19" | 190 m || multiple || 2000–2003 || 25 Mar 2003 || 162 || align=left | Disc.: LINEARPotentially hazardous object || 
|- id="2003 BS47" bgcolor=#FFC2E0
| 7 ||  || APO || 25.8 || data-sort-value="0.025" | 25 m || single || 2 days || 02 Feb 2003 || 11 || align=left | Disc.: LINEARAMO at MPC || 
|- id="2003 BH50" bgcolor=#fefefe
| 0 ||  || MBA-I || 17.68 || data-sort-value="0.87" | 870 m || multiple || 2003–2021 || 07 Aug 2021 || 157 || align=left | Disc.: LINEARAlt.: 2014 FS85 || 
|- id="2003 BP50" bgcolor=#fefefe
| 0 ||  || MBA-I || 17.2 || 1.1 km || multiple || 2001–2021 || 09 Jan 2021 || 194 || align=left | Disc.: LINEARAlt.: 2009 YL26, 2016 QX40 || 
|- id="2003 BQ54" bgcolor=#fefefe
| 1 ||  || MBA-I || 17.8 || data-sort-value="0.82" | 820 m || multiple || 2002–2016 || 04 Apr 2016 || 78 || align=left | Disc.: LPL/Spacewatch IIAlt.: 2014 QT94 || 
|- id="2003 BH69" bgcolor=#fefefe
| 0 ||  || MBA-I || 18.01 || data-sort-value="0.74" | 740 m || multiple || 2003–2021 || 11 Sep 2021 || 136 || align=left | Disc.: Kvistaberg Obs.Alt.: 2014 NF7 || 
|- id="2003 BG72" bgcolor=#E9E9E9
| 0 ||  || MBA-M || 16.8 || 1.8 km || multiple || 2003–2020 || 19 Jan 2020 || 177 || align=left | Disc.: NEATAlt.: 2012 FU74 || 
|- id="2003 BC75" bgcolor=#E9E9E9
| 0 ||  || MBA-M || 17.4 || data-sort-value="0.98" | 980 m || multiple || 2003–2020 || 25 May 2020 || 65 || align=left | Disc.: NEAT || 
|- id="2003 BZ75" bgcolor=#fefefe
| 1 ||  || MBA-I || 18.1 || data-sort-value="0.71" | 710 m || multiple || 2003–2020 || 20 Oct 2020 || 78 || align=left | Disc.: NEAT || 
|- id="2003 BH76" bgcolor=#E9E9E9
| 0 ||  || MBA-M || 17.09 || 1.6 km || multiple || 2003–2021 || 02 Oct 2021 || 309 || align=left | Disc.: NEATAlt.: 2016 ET195 || 
|- id="2003 BU84" bgcolor=#fefefe
| 0 ||  || MBA-I || 17.86 || data-sort-value="0.80" | 800 m || multiple || 2003–2021 || 14 Apr 2021 || 115 || align=left | Disc.: NEAT || 
|- id="2003 BB85" bgcolor=#E9E9E9
| 0 ||  || MBA-M || 16.9 || 2.3 km || multiple || 2000–2021 || 15 Jan 2021 || 177 || align=left | Disc.: LINEARAlt.: 2014 OY367 || 
|- id="2003 BJ85" bgcolor=#d6d6d6
| 0 ||  || MBA-O || 16.74 || 2.5 km || multiple || 2001–2021 || 12 May 2021 || 83 || align=left | Disc.: VATT || 
|- id="2003 BR85" bgcolor=#E9E9E9
| 0 ||  || MBA-M || 16.95 || 2.3 km || multiple || 2003–2021 || 09 Apr 2021 || 162 || align=left | Disc.: LPL/Spacewatch IIAlt.: 2010 VH49, 2012 CT51, 2014 QT374, 2016 AT80 || 
|- id="2003 BK86" bgcolor=#d6d6d6
| 0 ||  || MBA-O || 17.01 || 2.2 km || multiple || 2003–2021 || 08 May 2021 || 41 || align=left | Disc.: La Silla Obs.Added on 19 October 2020 || 
|- id="2003 BL86" bgcolor=#E9E9E9
| 1 ||  || MBA-M || 17.8 || data-sort-value="0.82" | 820 m || multiple || 2003–2020 || 11 May 2020 || 65 || align=left | Disc.: La Silla Obs. || 
|- id="2003 BR86" bgcolor=#E9E9E9
| 0 ||  || MBA-M || 16.5 || 2.1 km || multiple || 2000–2021 || 12 Jun 2021 || 148 || align=left | Disc.: LONEOSAlt.: 2012 DE78 || 
|- id="2003 BE87" bgcolor=#fefefe
| 0 ||  || MBA-I || 17.9 || data-sort-value="0.78" | 780 m || multiple || 2003–2020 || 26 Feb 2020 || 118 || align=left | Disc.: LPL/Spacewatch IIAlt.: 2013 AV10 || 
|- id="2003 BF91" bgcolor=#C2E0FF
| E ||  || TNO || 11.7 || 16 km || single || 13 days || 08 Feb 2003 || 10 || align=left | Disc.: Hubble TelescopeLoUTNOs, cubewano? || 
|- id="2003 BG91" bgcolor=#C2E0FF
| E ||  || TNO || 10.7 || 25 km || single || 92 days || 29 Apr 2003 || 13 || align=left | Disc.: Hubble TelescopeLoUTNOs, cubewano? || 
|- id="2003 BH91" bgcolor=#C2E0FF
| E ||  || TNO || 11.9 || 14 km || single || 13 days || 08 Feb 2003 || 12 || align=left | Disc.: Hubble TelescopeLoUTNOs, cubewano? || 
|- id="2003 BO92" bgcolor=#FA8072
| 0 ||  || HUN || 18.79 || data-sort-value="0.52" | 520 m || multiple || 2003–2021 || 08 Apr 2021 || 137 || align=left | Disc.: SDSS || 
|- id="2003 BW92" bgcolor=#d6d6d6
| 0 ||  || MBA-O || 16.83 || 2.4 km || multiple || 2003–2021 || 28 Aug 2021 || 76 || align=left | Disc.: LPL/Spacewatch IIAdded on 22 July 2020Alt.: 2016 QT51 || 
|- id="2003 BZ93" bgcolor=#fefefe
| 0 ||  || MBA-I || 17.1 || 1.1 km || multiple || 2003–2021 || 05 Jan 2021 || 191 || align=left | Disc.: SDSSAlt.: 2003 BA94, 2003 FX133, 2012 QW34, 2016 TM57 || 
|- id="2003 BB94" bgcolor=#E9E9E9
| 0 ||  || MBA-M || 17.6 || 1.7 km || multiple || 2003–2021 || 18 Jan 2021 || 71 || align=left | Disc.: LPL/Spacewatch IIAlt.: 2010 TD74, 2015 XQ286 || 
|- id="2003 BC94" bgcolor=#E9E9E9
| 0 ||  || MBA-M || 17.2 || 2.0 km || multiple || 2001–2021 || 17 Jan 2021 || 107 || align=left | Disc.: SDSSAlt.: 2015 XK152 || 
|- id="2003 BJ94" bgcolor=#fefefe
| 1 ||  || HUN || 17.8 || data-sort-value="0.82" | 820 m || multiple || 2003–2021 || 14 Jan 2021 || 58 || align=left | Disc.: NEATAlt.: 2014 HU132 || 
|- id="2003 BN94" bgcolor=#E9E9E9
| 0 ||  || MBA-M || 16.6 || 2.0 km || multiple || 2003–2020 || 24 Mar 2020 || 175 || align=left | Disc.: NEAT || 
|- id="2003 BS94" bgcolor=#fefefe
| 0 ||  || MBA-I || 17.5 || data-sort-value="0.94" | 940 m || multiple || 2003–2021 || 09 Jan 2021 || 186 || align=left | Disc.: NEATAlt.: 2005 SA35 || 
|- id="2003 BW94" bgcolor=#d6d6d6
| 0 ||  || MBA-O || 16.4 || 2.9 km || multiple || 2003–2020 || 20 May 2020 || 152 || align=left | Disc.: NEATAlt.: 2013 YP87, 2015 LS16 || 
|- id="2003 BY94" bgcolor=#E9E9E9
| 2 ||  || MBA-M || 17.6 || data-sort-value="0.90" | 900 m || multiple || 2003–2018 || 10 Oct 2018 || 28 || align=left | Disc.: NEAT || 
|- id="2003 BZ94" bgcolor=#E9E9E9
| 0 ||  || MBA-M || 16.77 || 1.9 km || multiple || 2003–2021 || 06 Jun 2021 || 207 || align=left | Disc.: NEATAlt.: 2012 BN16 || 
|- id="2003 BA95" bgcolor=#d6d6d6
| 0 ||  || HIL || 16.0 || 3.5 km || multiple || 2003–2020 || 19 Apr 2020 || 64 || align=left | Disc.: SDSSAlt.: 2008 SV213 || 
|- id="2003 BC95" bgcolor=#d6d6d6
| 0 ||  || MBA-O || 16.0 || 3.5 km || multiple || 2003–2020 || 24 Apr 2020 || 122 || align=left | Disc.: SDSS || 
|- id="2003 BF95" bgcolor=#d6d6d6
| 0 ||  || MBA-O || 16.7 || 2.5 km || multiple || 2003–2020 || 16 Apr 2020 || 100 || align=left | Disc.: SDSS || 
|- id="2003 BH95" bgcolor=#d6d6d6
| 0 ||  || MBA-O || 16.13 || 3.3 km || multiple || 2003–2021 || 11 Apr 2021 || 168 || align=left | Disc.: SDSS || 
|- id="2003 BK95" bgcolor=#d6d6d6
| 0 ||  || MBA-O || 16.1 || 3.4 km || multiple || 2003–2020 || 16 May 2020 || 120 || align=left | Disc.: SDSS || 
|- id="2003 BM95" bgcolor=#d6d6d6
| 0 ||  || MBA-O || 16.28 || 3.1 km || multiple || 2003–2019 || 28 Feb 2019 || 110 || align=left | Disc.: SDSS || 
|- id="2003 BN95" bgcolor=#d6d6d6
| 0 ||  || MBA-O || 16.91 || 2.3 km || multiple || 2003–2021 || 06 Aug 2021 || 105 || align=left | Disc.: SDSS || 
|- id="2003 BP95" bgcolor=#fefefe
| 0 ||  || MBA-I || 17.6 || data-sort-value="0.90" | 900 m || multiple || 2003–2020 || 16 Nov 2020 || 110 || align=left | Disc.: NEAT || 
|- id="2003 BQ95" bgcolor=#E9E9E9
| 0 ||  || MBA-M || 17.4 || 1.4 km || multiple || 2003–2020 || 25 Mar 2020 || 109 || align=left | Disc.: LPL/Spacewatch II || 
|- id="2003 BR95" bgcolor=#E9E9E9
| 0 ||  || MBA-M || 16.5 || 2.1 km || multiple || 2003–2020 || 25 Jan 2020 || 76 || align=left | Disc.: SDSSAlt.: 2018 SY15 || 
|- id="2003 BS95" bgcolor=#fefefe
| 0 ||  || MBA-I || 17.54 || data-sort-value="0.92" | 920 m || multiple || 2003–2021 || 17 Apr 2021 || 129 || align=left | Disc.: NEAT || 
|- id="2003 BT95" bgcolor=#fefefe
| 0 ||  || MBA-I || 17.5 || data-sort-value="0.94" | 940 m || multiple || 2003–2021 || 18 Jan 2021 || 115 || align=left | Disc.: LPL/Spacewatch II || 
|- id="2003 BU95" bgcolor=#fefefe
| 0 ||  || MBA-I || 17.75 || data-sort-value="0.84" | 840 m || multiple || 2003–2021 || 14 May 2021 || 93 || align=left | Disc.: SDSS || 
|- id="2003 BW95" bgcolor=#d6d6d6
| 0 ||  || MBA-O || 16.0 || 3.5 km || multiple || 2001–2020 || 26 May 2020 || 94 || align=left | Disc.: SDSS || 
|- id="2003 BX95" bgcolor=#d6d6d6
| 0 ||  || MBA-O || 16.56 || 2.7 km || multiple || 2003–2021 || 15 Jun 2021 || 101 || align=left | Disc.: SDSS || 
|- id="2003 BY95" bgcolor=#d6d6d6
| 0 ||  || MBA-O || 16.3 || 3.1 km || multiple || 2003–2019 || 08 Feb 2019 || 75 || align=left | Disc.: NEAT || 
|- id="2003 BZ95" bgcolor=#d6d6d6
| 0 ||  || MBA-O || 16.59 || 2.7 km || multiple || 2003–2021 || 12 May 2021 || 97 || align=left | Disc.: SDSS || 
|- id="2003 BA96" bgcolor=#E9E9E9
| 0 ||  || MBA-M || 17.86 || data-sort-value="0.80" | 800 m || multiple || 2003–2021 || 08 Sep 2021 || 103 || align=left | Disc.: SDSS || 
|- id="2003 BB96" bgcolor=#E9E9E9
| 0 ||  || MBA-M || 16.9 || 2.3 km || multiple || 2003–2021 || 22 Jan 2021 || 94 || align=left | Disc.: La Silla Obs. || 
|- id="2003 BD96" bgcolor=#d6d6d6
| 0 ||  || MBA-O || 16.50 || 2.8 km || multiple || 2003–2021 || 09 May 2021 || 126 || align=left | Disc.: NEAT || 
|- id="2003 BE96" bgcolor=#d6d6d6
| 0 ||  || MBA-O || 16.3 || 3.1 km || multiple || 2003–2020 || 17 Apr 2020 || 80 || align=left | Disc.: SDSS || 
|- id="2003 BH96" bgcolor=#d6d6d6
| 0 ||  || MBA-O || 16.49 || 2.8 km || multiple || 2000–2021 || 10 May 2021 || 121 || align=left | Disc.: SDSS || 
|- id="2003 BK96" bgcolor=#d6d6d6
| 0 ||  || MBA-O || 16.59 || 2.7 km || multiple || 2003–2021 || 19 May 2021 || 70 || align=left | Disc.: SDSS || 
|- id="2003 BL96" bgcolor=#d6d6d6
| 0 ||  || MBA-O || 16.5 || 2.8 km || multiple || 2003–2019 || 08 Feb 2019 || 62 || align=left | Disc.: SDSS || 
|- id="2003 BM96" bgcolor=#E9E9E9
| 0 ||  || MBA-M || 16.8 || 1.8 km || multiple || 2003–2020 || 21 Apr 2020 || 119 || align=left | Disc.: SDSS || 
|- id="2003 BO96" bgcolor=#E9E9E9
| 0 ||  || MBA-M || 17.1 || 2.1 km || multiple || 2001–2021 || 17 Jan 2021 || 115 || align=left | Disc.: SDSS || 
|- id="2003 BP96" bgcolor=#d6d6d6
| 0 ||  || MBA-O || 16.5 || 2.8 km || multiple || 2003–2020 || 24 Mar 2020 || 62 || align=left | Disc.: SDSSAlt.: 2010 DV84 || 
|- id="2003 BQ96" bgcolor=#E9E9E9
| 0 ||  || MBA-M || 17.4 || data-sort-value="0.98" | 980 m || multiple || 2003–2020 || 27 Apr 2020 || 71 || align=left | Disc.: SDSS || 
|- id="2003 BS96" bgcolor=#E9E9E9
| 0 ||  || MBA-M || 17.1 || 1.1 km || multiple || 2003–2018 || 15 Dec 2018 || 48 || align=left | Disc.: SDSS || 
|- id="2003 BT96" bgcolor=#d6d6d6
| 0 ||  || MBA-O || 16.3 || 3.1 km || multiple || 2003–2020 || 23 Dec 2020 || 69 || align=left | Disc.: La Silla Obs.Alt.: 2010 NS142, 2011 OO53 || 
|- id="2003 BU96" bgcolor=#d6d6d6
| 0 ||  || MBA-O || 16.8 || 2.4 km || multiple || 2003–2020 || 27 Apr 2020 || 64 || align=left | Disc.: SDSS || 
|- id="2003 BV96" bgcolor=#fefefe
| 0 ||  || MBA-I || 18.08 || data-sort-value="0.72" | 720 m || multiple || 2003–2022 || 27 Jan 2022 || 68 || align=left | Disc.: SDSS || 
|- id="2003 BX96" bgcolor=#d6d6d6
| 0 ||  || MBA-O || 17.32 || 1.9 km || multiple || 2003–2020 || 15 May 2020 || 56 || align=left | Disc.: SDSS || 
|- id="2003 BY96" bgcolor=#E9E9E9
| 0 ||  || MBA-M || 16.82 || 1.8 km || multiple || 2003–2021 || 06 Apr 2021 || 73 || align=left | Disc.: NEATAlt.: 2016 BV27 || 
|- id="2003 BA97" bgcolor=#E9E9E9
| 0 ||  || MBA-M || 17.1 || 2.1 km || multiple || 2003–2021 || 17 Jan 2021 || 82 || align=left | Disc.: SDSS || 
|- id="2003 BC97" bgcolor=#d6d6d6
| 0 ||  || MBA-O || 17.1 || 2.1 km || multiple || 2003–2020 || 27 Apr 2020 || 54 || align=left | Disc.: SDSS || 
|- id="2003 BD97" bgcolor=#d6d6d6
| 0 ||  || MBA-O || 16.6 || 2.7 km || multiple || 2003–2020 || 25 May 2020 || 71 || align=left | Disc.: NEAT || 
|- id="2003 BE97" bgcolor=#d6d6d6
| 0 ||  || MBA-O || 16.48 || 2.8 km || multiple || 2003–2020 || 17 May 2020 || 65 || align=left | Disc.: SDSS || 
|- id="2003 BG97" bgcolor=#E9E9E9
| 0 ||  || MBA-M || 17.83 || 1.1 km || multiple || 2003–2021 || 06 May 2021 || 70 || align=left | Disc.: SDSS || 
|- id="2003 BH97" bgcolor=#E9E9E9
| 0 ||  || MBA-M || 18.0 || 1.1 km || multiple || 2003–2020 || 22 Mar 2020 || 67 || align=left | Disc.: SDSS || 
|- id="2003 BJ97" bgcolor=#E9E9E9
| 0 ||  || MBA-M || 17.3 || 1.9 km || multiple || 2003–2021 || 04 Jan 2021 || 71 || align=left | Disc.: NEAT || 
|- id="2003 BK97" bgcolor=#E9E9E9
| 0 ||  || MBA-M || 17.4 || 1.8 km || multiple || 2003–2021 || 13 Jan 2021 || 50 || align=left | Disc.: SDSS || 
|- id="2003 BL97" bgcolor=#d6d6d6
| 0 ||  || MBA-O || 17.18 || 2.0 km || multiple || 2003–2021 || 09 Jul 2021 || 48 || align=left | Disc.: SDSS || 
|- id="2003 BM97" bgcolor=#d6d6d6
| 0 ||  || MBA-O || 16.8 || 2.4 km || multiple || 2003–2020 || 15 May 2020 || 54 || align=left | Disc.: SDSS || 
|- id="2003 BN97" bgcolor=#C2FFFF
| 0 ||  || JT || 13.7 || 10 km || multiple || 2003–2018 || 22 Mar 2018 || 45 || align=left | Disc.: SDSSTrojan camp (L5)Alt.: 2010 GC196 || 
|- id="2003 BO97" bgcolor=#d6d6d6
| 0 ||  || MBA-O || 17.19 || 2.0 km || multiple || 2003–2020 || 29 Apr 2020 || 54 || align=left | Disc.: SDSS || 
|- id="2003 BP97" bgcolor=#E9E9E9
| 0 ||  || MBA-M || 18.15 || data-sort-value="0.99" | 990 m || multiple || 2003–2020 || 28 Jan 2020 || 136 || align=left | Disc.: SDSS || 
|- id="2003 BQ97" bgcolor=#E9E9E9
| 0 ||  || MBA-M || 17.4 || 1.8 km || multiple || 2003–2019 || 31 Aug 2019 || 48 || align=left | Disc.: SDSS || 
|- id="2003 BR97" bgcolor=#E9E9E9
| 0 ||  || MBA-M || 18.0 || 1.1 km || multiple || 2003–2020 || 25 Jan 2020 || 70 || align=left | Disc.: SDSS || 
|- id="2003 BS97" bgcolor=#d6d6d6
| 0 ||  || MBA-O || 16.7 || 2.5 km || multiple || 2003–2021 || 05 Jan 2021 || 69 || align=left | Disc.: LPL/Spacewatch II || 
|- id="2003 BT97" bgcolor=#fefefe
| 0 ||  || MBA-I || 18.3 || data-sort-value="0.65" | 650 m || multiple || 2003–2020 || 11 Dec 2020 || 155 || align=left | Disc.: SDSS || 
|- id="2003 BV97" bgcolor=#E9E9E9
| 0 ||  || MBA-M || 17.1 || 1.6 km || multiple || 2003–2020 || 02 Feb 2020 || 67 || align=left | Disc.: SDSS || 
|- id="2003 BY97" bgcolor=#fefefe
| 0 ||  || MBA-I || 18.0 || data-sort-value="0.75" | 750 m || multiple || 2003–2020 || 04 Jan 2020 || 58 || align=left | Disc.: LPL/Spacewatch II || 
|- id="2003 BZ97" bgcolor=#d6d6d6
| 0 ||  || MBA-O || 16.7 || 2.5 km || multiple || 2003–2020 || 22 Apr 2020 || 47 || align=left | Disc.: SDSS || 
|- id="2003 BA98" bgcolor=#d6d6d6
| 0 ||  || MBA-O || 17.0 || 2.2 km || multiple || 2003–2017 || 24 Sep 2017 || 42 || align=left | Disc.: SDSS || 
|- id="2003 BB98" bgcolor=#fefefe
| 0 ||  || MBA-I || 17.86 || data-sort-value="0.80" | 800 m || multiple || 2003–2021 || 09 Apr 2021 || 123 || align=left | Disc.: SDSS || 
|- id="2003 BD98" bgcolor=#fefefe
| 0 ||  || MBA-I || 18.13 || data-sort-value="0.70" | 700 m || multiple || 2003–2021 || 08 May 2021 || 88 || align=left | Disc.: LPL/Spacewatch II || 
|- id="2003 BE98" bgcolor=#E9E9E9
| 0 ||  || MBA-M || 16.92 || 1.7 km || multiple || 2003–2021 || 11 May 2021 || 145 || align=left | Disc.: NEAT || 
|- id="2003 BF98" bgcolor=#E9E9E9
| 0 ||  || MBA-M || 17.66 || 1.2 km || multiple || 2003–2021 || 19 May 2021 || 79 || align=left | Disc.: SDSS || 
|- id="2003 BG98" bgcolor=#E9E9E9
| 0 ||  || MBA-M || 17.8 || 1.5 km || multiple || 2003–2021 || 22 Jan 2021 || 48 || align=left | Disc.: SDSS || 
|- id="2003 BH98" bgcolor=#fefefe
| 1 ||  || MBA-I || 18.6 || data-sort-value="0.57" | 570 m || multiple || 2003–2019 || 07 Dec 2019 || 37 || align=left | Disc.: LPL/Spacewatch II || 
|- id="2003 BJ98" bgcolor=#fefefe
| 0 ||  || MBA-I || 18.5 || data-sort-value="0.59" | 590 m || multiple || 2003–2019 || 27 Oct 2019 || 38 || align=left | Disc.: SDSS || 
|- id="2003 BK98" bgcolor=#d6d6d6
| 0 ||  || MBA-O || 16.8 || 2.4 km || multiple || 2003–2021 || 14 Jun 2021 || 74 || align=left | Disc.: SDSS || 
|- id="2003 BL98" bgcolor=#d6d6d6
| 0 ||  || MBA-O || 16.3 || 3.1 km || multiple || 2003–2021 || 07 Jan 2021 || 60 || align=left | Disc.: SDSS || 
|- id="2003 BM98" bgcolor=#fefefe
| 0 ||  || MBA-I || 18.31 || data-sort-value="0.65" | 650 m || multiple || 2003–2021 || 14 Apr 2021 || 93 || align=left | Disc.: SDSS || 
|- id="2003 BN98" bgcolor=#d6d6d6
| 0 ||  || MBA-O || 16.74 || 2.5 km || multiple || 2003–2020 || 29 Jan 2020 || 46 || align=left | Disc.: SDSS || 
|- id="2003 BO98" bgcolor=#fefefe
| 0 ||  || MBA-I || 18.5 || data-sort-value="0.59" | 590 m || multiple || 2003–2020 || 15 Oct 2020 || 44 || align=left | Disc.: LPL/Spacewatch II || 
|- id="2003 BQ98" bgcolor=#fefefe
| 0 ||  || MBA-I || 18.82 || data-sort-value="0.51" | 510 m || multiple || 2003–2021 || 09 Dec 2021 || 48 || align=left | Disc.: LPL/Spacewatch II || 
|- id="2003 BR98" bgcolor=#fefefe
| 0 ||  || MBA-I || 18.92 || data-sort-value="0.49" | 490 m || multiple || 2003–2021 || 09 Nov 2021 || 96 || align=left | Disc.: LPL/Spacewatch II || 
|- id="2003 BS98" bgcolor=#fefefe
| 0 ||  || MBA-I || 17.9 || data-sort-value="0.78" | 780 m || multiple || 2003–2019 || 26 Sep 2019 || 42 || align=left | Disc.: SDSS || 
|- id="2003 BT98" bgcolor=#d6d6d6
| 0 ||  || MBA-O || 16.99 || 2.2 km || multiple || 2003–2021 || 06 Dec 2021 || 92 || align=left | Disc.: SDSS || 
|- id="2003 BU98" bgcolor=#fefefe
| 2 ||  || HUN || 19.1 || data-sort-value="0.45" | 450 m || multiple || 2003–2019 || 05 Feb 2019 || 32 || align=left | Disc.: NEAT || 
|- id="2003 BV98" bgcolor=#fefefe
| 0 ||  || MBA-I || 18.3 || data-sort-value="0.65" | 650 m || multiple || 2003–2020 || 21 Oct 2020 || 162 || align=left | Disc.: SDSS || 
|- id="2003 BW98" bgcolor=#d6d6d6
| 0 ||  || MBA-O || 17.0 || 2.2 km || multiple || 2003–2017 || 16 Oct 2017 || 38 || align=left | Disc.: La Silla Obs. || 
|- id="2003 BX98" bgcolor=#d6d6d6
| 0 ||  || MBA-O || 16.34 || 3.0 km || multiple || 2003–2021 || 16 Apr 2021 || 47 || align=left | Disc.: La Silla Obs. || 
|- id="2003 BY98" bgcolor=#E9E9E9
| 0 ||  || MBA-M || 17.30 || 1.9 km || multiple || 2003–2022 || 26 Jan 2022 || 101 || align=left | Disc.: SDSS || 
|- id="2003 BZ98" bgcolor=#E9E9E9
| 0 ||  || MBA-M || 17.4 || 1.4 km || multiple || 2003–2019 || 28 Dec 2019 || 70 || align=left | Disc.: SDSS || 
|- id="2003 BA99" bgcolor=#fefefe
| 0 ||  || MBA-I || 18.95 || data-sort-value="0.48" | 480 m || multiple || 2003–2021 || 13 Apr 2021 || 34 || align=left | Disc.: SDSS || 
|- id="2003 BB99" bgcolor=#E9E9E9
| 0 ||  || MBA-M || 17.3 || 1.9 km || multiple || 2003–2021 || 18 Jan 2021 || 52 || align=left | Disc.: SDSS || 
|- id="2003 BC99" bgcolor=#fefefe
| 0 ||  || MBA-I || 17.4 || data-sort-value="0.98" | 980 m || multiple || 2003–2021 || 07 Jan 2021 || 84 || align=left | Disc.: SDSS || 
|- id="2003 BE99" bgcolor=#d6d6d6
| 0 ||  || MBA-O || 16.65 || 2.6 km || multiple || 2003–2021 || 15 Apr 2021 || 89 || align=left | Disc.: SDSS || 
|- id="2003 BF99" bgcolor=#E9E9E9
| 0 ||  || MBA-M || 17.0 || 1.2 km || multiple || 2003–2020 || 17 May 2020 || 66 || align=left | Disc.: LONEOS || 
|- id="2003 BG99" bgcolor=#E9E9E9
| 0 ||  || MBA-M || 17.5 || 1.3 km || multiple || 2003–2021 || 12 Jan 2021 || 59 || align=left | Disc.: SDSS || 
|- id="2003 BH99" bgcolor=#E9E9E9
| 0 ||  || MBA-M || 17.14 || 1.6 km || multiple || 2003–2021 || 11 May 2021 || 88 || align=left | Disc.: NEAT || 
|- id="2003 BK99" bgcolor=#d6d6d6
| 0 ||  || MBA-O || 16.51 || 2.8 km || multiple || 2003–2021 || 12 May 2021 || 93 || align=left | Disc.: SDSS || 
|- id="2003 BL99" bgcolor=#d6d6d6
| 0 ||  || MBA-O || 16.9 || 2.3 km || multiple || 1995–2019 || 28 Jan 2019 || 52 || align=left | Disc.: SDSS || 
|- id="2003 BM99" bgcolor=#d6d6d6
| 0 ||  || MBA-O || 16.32 || 3.0 km || multiple || 2003–2021 || 03 May 2021 || 113 || align=left | Disc.: SDSS || 
|- id="2003 BN99" bgcolor=#d6d6d6
| 0 ||  || HIL || 15.4 || 4.6 km || multiple || 2003–2020 || 24 Jun 2020 || 119 || align=left | Disc.: LPL/Spacewatch IIAlt.: 2010 EY12 || 
|- id="2003 BO99" bgcolor=#fefefe
| 0 ||  || MBA-I || 19.31 || data-sort-value="0.41" | 410 m || multiple || 1995–2021 || 08 Sep 2021 || 56 || align=left | Disc.: La Silla Obs. || 
|- id="2003 BP99" bgcolor=#E9E9E9
| 0 ||  || MBA-M || 17.43 || 1.4 km || multiple || 2003–2021 || 01 May 2021 || 71 || align=left | Disc.: SDSS || 
|- id="2003 BQ99" bgcolor=#FA8072
| 0 ||  || MCA || 18.36 || data-sort-value="0.63" | 630 m || multiple || 2003–2021 || 09 Aug 2021 || 54 || align=left | Disc.: LONEOS || 
|- id="2003 BT99" bgcolor=#fefefe
| 2 ||  || MBA-I || 18.5 || data-sort-value="0.59" | 590 m || multiple || 1998–2019 || 01 Nov 2019 || 55 || align=left | Disc.: SDSSAlt.: 2012 TX376, 2012 UZ235 || 
|- id="2003 BU99" bgcolor=#E9E9E9
| 0 ||  || MBA-M || 17.6 || 1.3 km || multiple || 2003–2019 || 26 Nov 2019 || 65 || align=left | Disc.: SDSSAlt.: 2015 RJ285 || 
|- id="2003 BV99" bgcolor=#d6d6d6
| 0 ||  || MBA-O || 16.36 || 3.0 km || multiple || 2003–2021 || 15 Apr 2021 || 76 || align=left | Disc.: La Silla Obs. || 
|- id="2003 BW99" bgcolor=#d6d6d6
| 0 ||  || MBA-O || 17.29 || 1.9 km || multiple || 2003–2021 || 08 May 2021 || 45 || align=left | Disc.: SDSS || 
|- id="2003 BX99" bgcolor=#d6d6d6
| 0 ||  || MBA-O || 17.1 || 2.1 km || multiple || 2003–2019 || 07 Mar 2019 || 52 || align=left | Disc.: LPL/Spacewatch II || 
|- id="2003 BY99" bgcolor=#d6d6d6
| 0 ||  || MBA-O || 16.9 || 2.3 km || multiple || 2003–2020 || 25 Mar 2020 || 63 || align=left | Disc.: SDSS || 
|- id="2003 BZ99" bgcolor=#E9E9E9
| 0 ||  || MBA-M || 18.0 || 1.1 km || multiple || 2001–2019 || 25 Nov 2019 || 47 || align=left | Disc.: LPL/Spacewatch II || 
|- id="2003 BA100" bgcolor=#E9E9E9
| 1 ||  || MBA-M || 18.76 || data-sort-value="0.74" | 740 m || multiple || 2003–2019 || 02 Nov 2019 || 37 || align=left | Disc.: SDSS || 
|- id="2003 BB100" bgcolor=#fefefe
| 0 ||  || MBA-I || 17.9 || data-sort-value="0.78" | 780 m || multiple || 2003–2021 || 18 Jan 2021 || 48 || align=left | Disc.: SDSS || 
|- id="2003 BC100" bgcolor=#d6d6d6
| 0 ||  || MBA-O || 17.3 || 1.9 km || multiple || 2003–2019 || 10 Jan 2019 || 32 || align=left | Disc.: SDSS || 
|- id="2003 BD100" bgcolor=#d6d6d6
| 0 ||  || MBA-O || 16.10 || 3.4 km || multiple || 1993–2021 || 10 Apr 2021 || 75 || align=left | Disc.: SDSSAlt.: 2010 MV141 || 
|- id="2003 BE100" bgcolor=#fefefe
| 1 ||  || MBA-I || 18.7 || data-sort-value="0.54" | 540 m || multiple || 2003–2019 || 24 Sep 2019 || 33 || align=left | Disc.: SDSS || 
|- id="2003 BF100" bgcolor=#d6d6d6
| 0 ||  || MBA-O || 17.3 || 1.9 km || multiple || 2003–2019 || 10 Mar 2019 || 48 || align=left | Disc.: LPL/Spacewatch II || 
|- id="2003 BG100" bgcolor=#fefefe
| 0 ||  || MBA-I || 18.3 || data-sort-value="0.65" | 650 m || multiple || 2003–2021 || 17 Jan 2021 || 39 || align=left | Disc.: SDSS || 
|- id="2003 BH100" bgcolor=#d6d6d6
| 0 ||  || MBA-O || 16.5 || 2.8 km || multiple || 2003–2021 || 12 Jun 2021 || 76 || align=left | Disc.: SDSS || 
|- id="2003 BJ100" bgcolor=#E9E9E9
| 0 ||  || MBA-M || 17.6 || 1.7 km || multiple || 2003–2021 || 18 Jan 2021 || 42 || align=left | Disc.: SDSS || 
|- id="2003 BK100" bgcolor=#d6d6d6
| 0 ||  || MBA-O || 17.17 || 2.0 km || multiple || 1998–2021 || 07 Sep 2021 || 46 || align=left | Disc.: SDSS || 
|- id="2003 BL100" bgcolor=#d6d6d6
| 0 ||  || MBA-O || 17.5 || 1.8 km || multiple || 2003–2020 || 22 Apr 2020 || 36 || align=left | Disc.: SDSS || 
|- id="2003 BM100" bgcolor=#fefefe
| 0 ||  || MBA-I || 19.03 || data-sort-value="0.46" | 460 m || multiple || 2003–2021 || 03 Apr 2021 || 31 || align=left | Disc.: SDSS || 
|- id="2003 BN100" bgcolor=#d6d6d6
| 0 ||  || MBA-O || 16.51 || 2.8 km || multiple || 1997–2021 || 09 May 2021 || 98 || align=left | Disc.: SDSS || 
|- id="2003 BO100" bgcolor=#fefefe
| 0 ||  || MBA-I || 18.0 || data-sort-value="0.75" | 750 m || multiple || 2003–2021 || 12 Jan 2021 || 29 || align=left | Disc.: SDSS || 
|- id="2003 BP100" bgcolor=#fefefe
| 0 ||  || MBA-I || 17.9 || data-sort-value="0.78" | 780 m || multiple || 2003–2021 || 16 Jun 2021 || 91 || align=left | Disc.: SDSS || 
|- id="2003 BQ100" bgcolor=#E9E9E9
| 1 ||  || MBA-M || 18.51 || data-sort-value="0.59" | 590 m || multiple || 2003–2021 || 31 Aug 2021 || 26 || align=left | Disc.: SDSS || 
|- id="2003 BS100" bgcolor=#E9E9E9
| 0 ||  || MBA-M || 17.75 || 1.2 km || multiple || 1993–2021 || 08 May 2021 || 107 || align=left | Disc.: SDSS || 
|- id="2003 BT100" bgcolor=#fefefe
| 0 ||  || MBA-I || 18.3 || data-sort-value="0.65" | 650 m || multiple || 2003–2021 || 17 Jan 2021 || 84 || align=left | Disc.: SDSS || 
|- id="2003 BV100" bgcolor=#E9E9E9
| 0 ||  || MBA-M || 18.2 || data-sort-value="0.96" | 960 m || multiple || 2003–2020 || 01 Feb 2020 || 66 || align=left | Disc.: SDSS || 
|- id="2003 BX100" bgcolor=#E9E9E9
| 0 ||  || MBA-M || 17.7 || 1.6 km || multiple || 2003–2021 || 12 Jan 2021 || 54 || align=left | Disc.: SDSS || 
|- id="2003 BY100" bgcolor=#fefefe
| 1 ||  || MBA-I || 18.6 || data-sort-value="0.57" | 570 m || multiple || 2003–2019 || 28 Nov 2019 || 47 || align=left | Disc.: SDSS || 
|- id="2003 BZ100" bgcolor=#E9E9E9
| 0 ||  || MBA-M || 17.3 || 1.9 km || multiple || 2003–2021 || 18 Jan 2021 || 51 || align=left | Disc.: SDSS || 
|- id="2003 BA101" bgcolor=#d6d6d6
| 0 ||  || MBA-O || 16.76 || 2.5 km || multiple || 2003–2021 || 28 Oct 2021 || 85 || align=left | Disc.: SDSS || 
|- id="2003 BD101" bgcolor=#d6d6d6
| 0 ||  || MBA-O || 17.9 || 1.5 km || multiple || 2003–2019 || 05 Feb 2019 || 42 || align=left | Disc.: SDSS || 
|- id="2003 BE101" bgcolor=#d6d6d6
| 0 ||  || MBA-O || 17.22 || 2.0 km || multiple || 2003–2021 || 31 Oct 2021 || 77 || align=left | Disc.: SDSS || 
|- id="2003 BF101" bgcolor=#E9E9E9
| 0 ||  || MBA-M || 17.4 || 1.8 km || multiple || 2003–2020 || 14 Dec 2020 || 56 || align=left | Disc.: SDSS || 
|- id="2003 BG101" bgcolor=#E9E9E9
| 0 ||  || MBA-M || 17.22 || 1.1 km || multiple || 2003–2021 || 09 Jul 2021 || 58 || align=left | Disc.: SDSS || 
|- id="2003 BH101" bgcolor=#fefefe
| 0 ||  || MBA-I || 18.5 || data-sort-value="0.59" | 590 m || multiple || 2003–2019 || 29 Jul 2019 || 33 || align=left | Disc.: SDSS || 
|- id="2003 BJ101" bgcolor=#fefefe
| 0 ||  || MBA-I || 18.2 || data-sort-value="0.68" | 680 m || multiple || 2003–2020 || 26 Dec 2020 || 69 || align=left | Disc.: SDSS || 
|- id="2003 BK101" bgcolor=#d6d6d6
| 0 ||  || MBA-O || 17.5 || 1.8 km || multiple || 2003–2020 || 23 Jun 2020 || 33 || align=left | Disc.: SDSS || 
|- id="2003 BL101" bgcolor=#E9E9E9
| 0 ||  || MBA-M || 17.90 || 1.5 km || multiple || 2003–2022 || 09 Jan 2022 || 38 || align=left | Disc.: LPL/Spacewatch II || 
|- id="2003 BM101" bgcolor=#d6d6d6
| 0 ||  || MBA-O || 17.1 || 2.1 km || multiple || 2001–2020 || 28 Apr 2020 || 32 || align=left | Disc.: SDSS || 
|- id="2003 BN101" bgcolor=#d6d6d6
| 0 ||  || MBA-O || 17.3 || 1.9 km || multiple || 2003–2020 || 23 Jun 2020 || 36 || align=left | Disc.: SDSS || 
|- id="2003 BO101" bgcolor=#fefefe
| 0 ||  || MBA-I || 18.1 || data-sort-value="0.71" | 710 m || multiple || 2003–2021 || 18 Jan 2021 || 50 || align=left | Disc.: SDSS || 
|- id="2003 BP101" bgcolor=#d6d6d6
| 0 ||  || MBA-O || 17.2 || 2.0 km || multiple || 2003–2019 || 07 May 2019 || 52 || align=left | Disc.: SDSS || 
|- id="2003 BQ101" bgcolor=#fefefe
| 0 ||  || MBA-I || 17.9 || data-sort-value="0.78" | 780 m || multiple || 2003–2020 || 22 Oct 2020 || 109 || align=left | Disc.: SDSS || 
|- id="2003 BR101" bgcolor=#E9E9E9
| 0 ||  || MBA-M || 17.40 || 1.4 km || multiple || 2003–2021 || 10 Apr 2021 || 70 || align=left | Disc.: LPL/Spacewatch II || 
|- id="2003 BS101" bgcolor=#E9E9E9
| 0 ||  || MBA-M || 17.3 || 1.9 km || multiple || 2003–2019 || 31 Dec 2019 || 73 || align=left | Disc.: SDSSAlt.: 2010 OJ84 || 
|- id="2003 BT101" bgcolor=#fefefe
| 1 ||  || MBA-I || 18.5 || data-sort-value="0.59" | 590 m || multiple || 2003–2019 || 29 Oct 2019 || 48 || align=left | Disc.: SDSS || 
|- id="2003 BU101" bgcolor=#C2FFFF
| 0 ||  || JT || 13.6 || 11 km || multiple || 2003–2018 || 13 Apr 2018 || 52 || align=left | Disc.: SDSSTrojan camp (L5) || 
|- id="2003 BW101" bgcolor=#d6d6d6
| 0 ||  || HIL || 16.05 || 3.4 km || multiple || 2003–2021 || 30 May 2021 || 67 || align=left | Disc.: SDSSAlt.: 2010 BV102 || 
|- id="2003 BX101" bgcolor=#d6d6d6
| 0 ||  || MBA-O || 16.4 || 2.9 km || multiple || 2003–2020 || 15 Dec 2020 || 32 || align=left | Disc.: SDSS || 
|- id="2003 BY101" bgcolor=#d6d6d6
| 0 ||  || MBA-O || 16.36 || 3.0 km || multiple || 2003–2021 || 15 Jun 2021 || 146 || align=left | Disc.: SDSS || 
|- id="2003 BZ101" bgcolor=#fefefe
| 0 ||  || MBA-I || 18.0 || data-sort-value="0.75" | 750 m || multiple || 1996–2021 || 18 Jan 2021 || 102 || align=left | Disc.: SDSS || 
|- id="2003 BB102" bgcolor=#fefefe
| 0 ||  || MBA-I || 18.1 || data-sort-value="0.71" | 710 m || multiple || 2003–2021 || 13 Jun 2021 || 77 || align=left | Disc.: SDSS || 
|- id="2003 BC102" bgcolor=#d6d6d6
| 0 ||  || MBA-O || 15.76 || 3.9 km || multiple || 2003–2021 || 10 May 2021 || 66 || align=left | Disc.: NEAT || 
|- id="2003 BD102" bgcolor=#d6d6d6
| 0 ||  || MBA-O || 16.7 || 2.5 km || multiple || 2003–2020 || 03 Feb 2020 || 58 || align=left | Disc.: SDSS || 
|- id="2003 BF102" bgcolor=#E9E9E9
| 0 ||  || MBA-M || 17.7 || 1.6 km || multiple || 2003–2019 || 28 Nov 2019 || 54 || align=left | Disc.: SDSS || 
|- id="2003 BH102" bgcolor=#d6d6d6
| 0 ||  || MBA-O || 17.1 || 2.1 km || multiple || 2003–2020 || 27 Apr 2020 || 60 || align=left | Disc.: SDSS || 
|- id="2003 BJ102" bgcolor=#d6d6d6
| 0 ||  || MBA-O || 16.6 || 2.7 km || multiple || 2003–2021 || 08 Jun 2021 || 56 || align=left | Disc.: SDSS || 
|- id="2003 BK102" bgcolor=#d6d6d6
| 0 ||  || MBA-O || 16.62 || 2.6 km || multiple || 2003–2021 || 06 Apr 2021 || 63 || align=left | Disc.: SDSS || 
|- id="2003 BL102" bgcolor=#E9E9E9
| 0 ||  || MBA-M || 17.3 || 1.5 km || multiple || 2003–2020 || 26 Jan 2020 || 44 || align=left | Disc.: SDSS || 
|- id="2003 BN102" bgcolor=#d6d6d6
| 0 ||  || MBA-O || 16.53 || 2.8 km || multiple || 2003–2021 || 18 Apr 2021 || 54 || align=left | Disc.: SDSSAlt.: 2010 NJ126 || 
|- id="2003 BO102" bgcolor=#d6d6d6
| 0 ||  || MBA-O || 16.72 || 2.5 km || multiple || 2003–2021 || 09 May 2021 || 65 || align=left | Disc.: SDSS || 
|- id="2003 BP102" bgcolor=#d6d6d6
| 0 ||  || MBA-O || 16.5 || 2.8 km || multiple || 2003–2020 || 22 Apr 2020 || 73 || align=left | Disc.: SDSS || 
|- id="2003 BQ102" bgcolor=#d6d6d6
| 0 ||  || MBA-O || 16.20 || 3.2 km || multiple || 1999–2021 || 10 May 2021 || 115 || align=left | Disc.: SDSSAlt.: 2010 GC47 || 
|- id="2003 BR102" bgcolor=#d6d6d6
| 0 ||  || MBA-O || 16.6 || 2.7 km || multiple || 2003–2020 || 14 Dec 2020 || 53 || align=left | Disc.: SDSS || 
|- id="2003 BS102" bgcolor=#d6d6d6
| 0 ||  || MBA-O || 17.4 || 1.8 km || multiple || 2003–2018 || 09 Dec 2018 || 33 || align=left | Disc.: SDSS || 
|- id="2003 BT102" bgcolor=#E9E9E9
| 0 ||  || MBA-M || 17.3 || 1.9 km || multiple || 2003–2020 || 09 Dec 2020 || 50 || align=left | Disc.: SDSS || 
|- id="2003 BW102" bgcolor=#d6d6d6
| 0 ||  || MBA-O || 16.4 || 2.9 km || multiple || 2003–2020 || 12 Apr 2020 || 54 || align=left | Disc.: LPL/Spacewatch II || 
|- id="2003 BX102" bgcolor=#d6d6d6
| 0 ||  || MBA-O || 16.6 || 2.7 km || multiple || 2003–2020 || 22 Mar 2020 || 63 || align=left | Disc.: SDSS || 
|- id="2003 BY102" bgcolor=#fefefe
| 0 ||  || MBA-I || 18.9 || data-sort-value="0.49" | 490 m || multiple || 2003–2019 || 10 Jan 2019 || 30 || align=left | Disc.: SDSS || 
|- id="2003 BZ102" bgcolor=#E9E9E9
| 0 ||  || MBA-M || 18.0 || 1.1 km || multiple || 2003–2020 || 30 Jan 2020 || 36 || align=left | Disc.: SDSS || 
|- id="2003 BA103" bgcolor=#d6d6d6
| 2 ||  || MBA-O || 17.8 || 1.5 km || multiple || 2003–2018 || 20 Jan 2018 || 27 || align=left | Disc.: LPL/Spacewatch II || 
|- id="2003 BB103" bgcolor=#d6d6d6
| 0 ||  || MBA-O || 17.0 || 2.2 km || multiple || 2003–2020 || 28 Apr 2020 || 51 || align=left | Disc.: SDSS || 
|- id="2003 BC103" bgcolor=#d6d6d6
| 0 ||  || MBA-O || 17.45 || 1.8 km || multiple || 2003–2021 || 10 Aug 2021 || 44 || align=left | Disc.: LPL/Spacewatch II || 
|- id="2003 BD103" bgcolor=#fefefe
| 0 ||  || MBA-I || 19.0 || data-sort-value="0.47" | 470 m || multiple || 2003–2018 || 23 Jan 2018 || 24 || align=left | Disc.: SDSS || 
|- id="2003 BF103" bgcolor=#fefefe
| 0 ||  || MBA-I || 18.7 || data-sort-value="0.54" | 540 m || multiple || 2003–2018 || 20 Feb 2018 || 36 || align=left | Disc.: SDSSAdded on 19 October 2020 || 
|- id="2003 BG103" bgcolor=#d6d6d6
| 0 ||  || MBA-O || 16.92 || 2.3 km || multiple || 2003–2021 || 19 Mar 2021 || 39 || align=left | Disc.: SDSSAdded on 19 October 2020 || 
|- id="2003 BH103" bgcolor=#d6d6d6
| 0 ||  || MBA-O || 17.36 || 1.9 km || multiple || 2000–2020 || 25 Feb 2020 || 37 || align=left | Disc.: LPL/Spacewatch IIAdded on 17 January 2021 || 
|- id="2003 BJ103" bgcolor=#d6d6d6
| 0 ||  || MBA-O || 16.7 || 2.5 km || multiple || 2000–2020 || 31 Jan 2020 || 59 || align=left | Disc.: SDSSAdded on 17 June 2021Alt.: 2009 BV110 || 
|- id="2003 BK103" bgcolor=#d6d6d6
| 4 ||  || MBA-O || 17.4 || 1.8 km || multiple || 2003–2020 || 16 Mar 2020 || 17 || align=left | Disc.: LPL/Spacewatch IIAdded on 9 March 2021 || 
|- id="2003 BM103" bgcolor=#fefefe
| 0 ||  || MBA-I || 18.9 || data-sort-value="0.49" | 490 m || multiple || 2001–2020 || 20 Oct 2020 || 39 || align=left | Disc.: SDSSAdded on 11 May 2021 || 
|- id="2003 BN103" bgcolor=#fefefe
| 0 ||  || MBA-I || 18.88 || data-sort-value="0.50" | 500 m || multiple || 2003–2021 || 20 Mar 2021 || 37 || align=left | Disc.: LPL/Spacewatch IIAdded on 11 May 2021 || 
|- id="2003 BO103" bgcolor=#E9E9E9
| 1 ||  || MBA-M || 18.3 || 1.2 km || multiple || 1999–2021 || 06 Mar 2021 || 29 || align=left | Disc.: No observationsAdded on 11 May 2021 || 
|- id="2003 BP103" bgcolor=#fefefe
| 0 ||  || MBA-I || 19.1 || data-sort-value="0.45" | 450 m || multiple || 2003–2021 || 01 May 2021 || 33 || align=left | Disc.: LPL/Spacewatch IIAdded on 17 June 2021 || 
|- id="2003 BQ103" bgcolor=#fefefe
| 0 ||  || MBA-I || 18.6 || data-sort-value="0.57" | 570 m || multiple || 2000–2021 || 08 May 2021 || 42 || align=left | Disc.: No observationsAdded on 17 June 2021 || 
|- id="2003 BR103" bgcolor=#E9E9E9
| 0 ||  || MBA-M || 17.6 || 1.7 km || multiple || 2003–2018 || 16 Jul 2018 || 26 || align=left | Disc.: La Silla Obs.Added on 21 August 2021 || 
|}
back to top

C 

|- id="2003 CG" bgcolor=#d6d6d6
| 1 || 2003 CG || MBA-O || 18.2 || 1.3 km || multiple || 2003–2020 || 24 Jun 2020 || 90 || align=left | Disc.: NEAT || 
|- id="2003 CH" bgcolor=#E9E9E9
| 0 || 2003 CH || MBA-M || 17.62 || data-sort-value="0.89" | 890 m || multiple || 2003–2021 || 08 Sep 2021 || 38 || align=left | Disc.: NEATAlt.: 2007 BN2 || 
|- id="2003 CK" bgcolor=#FA8072
| 0 || 2003 CK || MCA || 18.6 || data-sort-value="0.57" | 570 m || multiple || 2002–2020 || 22 Aug 2020 || 98 || align=left | Disc.: AMOS || 
|- id="2003 CW" bgcolor=#E9E9E9
| 0 || 2003 CW || MBA-M || 17.3 || 1.0 km || multiple || 2003–2020 || 16 Apr 2020 || 53 || align=left | Disc.: LINEAR || 
|- id="2003 CA2" bgcolor=#d6d6d6
| 0 ||  || MBA-O || 16.6 || 2.7 km || multiple || 2003–2020 || 24 Mar 2020 || 31 || align=left | Disc.: LPL/Spacewatch IIAdded on 24 December 2021 || 
|- id="2003 CA4" bgcolor=#FFC2E0
| 3 ||  || ATE || 23.6 || data-sort-value="0.068" | 68 m || multiple || 2003–2018 || 10 Feb 2018 || 166 || align=left | Disc.: AMOS || 
|- id="2003 CQ10" bgcolor=#fefefe
| 1 ||  || MBA-I || 17.9 || data-sort-value="0.78" | 780 m || multiple || 2003–2020 || 27 Jan 2020 || 101 || align=left | Disc.: NEATAlt.: 2010 CH42 || 
|- id="2003 CC11" bgcolor=#FFC2E0
| 1 ||  || AMO || 19.1 || 1.1 km || multiple || 2003–2014 || 20 Feb 2014 || 94 || align=left | Disc.: LINEAR || 
|- id="2003 CG11" bgcolor=#FFC2E0
| 0 ||  || APO || 20.5 || data-sort-value="0.28" | 280 m || multiple || 2003–2007 || 11 Aug 2007 || 81 || align=left | Disc.: LONEOSPotentially hazardous object || 
|- id="2003 CM11" bgcolor=#d6d6d6
| 2 ||  || MBA-O || 17.6 || 1.7 km || multiple || 2003–2008 || 03 Mar 2008 || 44 || align=left | Disc.: AMOS || 
|- id="2003 CP12" bgcolor=#d6d6d6
| 0 ||  || MBA-O || 15.9 || 3.7 km || multiple || 2002–2020 || 29 Apr 2020 || 202 || align=left | Disc.: NEAT || 
|- id="2003 CW14" bgcolor=#E9E9E9
| 0 ||  || MBA-M || 16.64 || 2.6 km || multiple || 2003–2021 || 05 May 2021 || 263 || align=left | Disc.: LONEOSAlt.: 2012 AX13 || 
|- id="2003 CV16" bgcolor=#fefefe
| 0 ||  || HUN || 18.01 || data-sort-value="0.74" | 740 m || multiple || 1998–2021 || 04 May 2021 || 325 || align=left | Disc.: Desert Eagle Obs.Alt.: 2011 GR47 || 
|- id="2003 CX16" bgcolor=#E9E9E9
| 0 ||  || MBA-M || 16.9 || 2.3 km || multiple || 2003–2019 || 25 Oct 2019 || 89 || align=left | Disc.: Desert Eagle Obs.Alt.: 2017 DK78 || 
|- id="2003 CV17" bgcolor=#fefefe
| 0 ||  || MBA-I || 18.80 || data-sort-value="0.52" | 520 m || multiple || 2003–2021 || 09 Aug 2021 || 128 || align=left | Disc.: NEAT || 
|- id="2003 CL18" bgcolor=#FFC2E0
| 1 ||  || APO || 20.6 || data-sort-value="0.27" | 270 m || multiple || 2002–2007 || 22 Feb 2007 || 46 || align=left | Disc.: NEAT || 
|- id="2003 CO20" bgcolor=#FFC2E0
| – ||  || APO || 23.1 || data-sort-value="0.085" | 85 m || single || 7 days || 18 Feb 2003 || 31 || align=left | Disc.: LINEAR || 
|- id="2003 CQ20" bgcolor=#FFC2E0
| 0 ||  || AMO || 20.4 || data-sort-value="0.30" | 300 m || multiple || 2003–2006 || 22 Mar 2006 || 158 || align=left | Disc.: LONEOS || 
|- id="2003 CS20" bgcolor=#FA8072
| 0 ||  || MCA || 18.66 || 0.8 km || multiple || 2003–2022 || 06 Jul 2022 || 121|| align=left | Disc.: La Silla Obs. || 
|- id="2003 CB22" bgcolor=#d6d6d6
| 0 ||  || HIL || 16.35 || 3.0 km || multiple || 2003–2021 || 12 Jun 2021 || 65 || align=left | Disc.: Mauna Kea Obs.Alt.: 2011 BQ22 || 
|- id="2003 CC22" bgcolor=#C7FF8F
| 1 ||  || CEN || 12.35 || 21 km || multiple || 2003–2022 || 18 May 2022 || 125 || align=left | Disc.: Mauna Kea Obs. || 
|- id="2003 CG22" bgcolor=#d6d6d6
| 0 ||  || MBA-O || 17.0 || 2.2 km || multiple || 2003–2020 || 06 Dec 2020 || 112 || align=left | Disc.: AstrovirtelAlt.: 2015 OP73 || 
|- id="2003 CO22" bgcolor=#fefefe
| 4 ||  || MBA-I || 19.1 || data-sort-value="0.45" | 450 m || multiple || 2003–2020 || 09 Dec 2020 || 25 || align=left | Disc.: AstrovirtelAdded on 17 June 2021 || 
|- id="2003 CS22" bgcolor=#d6d6d6
| 0 ||  || MBA-O || 17.1 || 2.1 km || multiple || 2003–2017 || 13 Nov 2017 || 39 || align=left | Disc.: Astrovirtel || 
|- id="2003 CT22" bgcolor=#d6d6d6
| 0 ||  || MBA-O || 16.45 || 2.9 km || multiple || 1994–2021 || 11 Apr 2021 || 78 || align=left | Disc.: AstrovirtelAlt.: 2018 VG27 || 
|- id="2003 CX22" bgcolor=#fefefe
| 0 ||  || MBA-I || 18.79 || data-sort-value="0.52" | 520 m || multiple || 2001–2021 || 09 Sep 2021 || 110 || align=left | Disc.: Astrovirtel || 
|- id="2003 CG23" bgcolor=#d6d6d6
| 1 ||  || MBA-O || 17.0 || 2.2 km || multiple || 2003–2021 || 04 Apr 2021 || 30 || align=left | Disc.: Astrovirtel || 
|- id="2003 CH23" bgcolor=#fefefe
| 0 ||  || MBA-I || 17.68 || data-sort-value="0.87" | 870 m || multiple || 2003–2021 || 03 May 2021 || 96 || align=left | Disc.: Astrovirtel || 
|- id="2003 CM23" bgcolor=#E9E9E9
| 0 ||  || MBA-M || 18.20 || data-sort-value="0.96" | 960 m || multiple || 2003–2021 || 05 Jun 2021 || 38 || align=left | Disc.: Astrovirtel || 
|- id="2003 CO23" bgcolor=#E9E9E9
| 0 ||  || MBA-M || 17.69 || 1.2 km || multiple || 2001–2021 || 09 Jul 2021 || 104 || align=left | Disc.: Astrovirtel || 
|- id="2003 CP23" bgcolor=#d6d6d6
| 0 ||  || MBA-O || 17.64 || 1.7 km || multiple || 2003–2021 || 13 Jul 2021 || 47 || align=left | Disc.: AstrovirtelAdded on 22 July 2020 || 
|- id="2003 CS23" bgcolor=#d6d6d6
| 0 ||  || MBA-O || 16.94 || 2.3 km || multiple || 2003–2021 || 30 Oct 2021 || 134 || align=left | Disc.: AstrovirtelAlt.: 2008 DP42 || 
|- id="2003 CV23" bgcolor=#fefefe
| 3 ||  || MBA-I || 18.3 || data-sort-value="0.65" | 650 m || multiple || 2003–2019 || 29 Jul 2019 || 25 || align=left | Disc.: AstrovirtelAdded on 22 July 2020 || 
|- id="2003 CX23" bgcolor=#fefefe
| 1 ||  || MBA-I || 18.8 || data-sort-value="0.52" | 520 m || multiple || 2003–2020 || 15 Aug 2020 || 22 || align=left | Disc.: Astrovirtel || 
|- id="2003 CE24" bgcolor=#d6d6d6
| 0 ||  || MBA-O || 17.26 || 2.0 km || multiple || 2003–2021 || 08 May 2021 || 50 || align=left | Disc.: AstrovirtelAdded on 19 October 2020 || 
|- id="2003 CV24" bgcolor=#d6d6d6
| 0 ||  || MBA-O || 15.7 || 4.0 km || multiple || 2003–2020 || 15 Jun 2020 || 167 || align=left | Disc.: NEATAlt.: 2014 LF9 || 
|- id="2003 CM25" bgcolor=#FA8072
| 0 ||  || MCA || 17.7 || data-sort-value="0.86" | 860 m || multiple || 2003–2021 || 17 Jan 2021 || 172 || align=left | Disc.: NEATAlt.: 2014 DY17 || 
|- id="2003 CP25" bgcolor=#E9E9E9
| 0 ||  || MBA-M || 16.6 || 2.0 km || multiple || 2000–2020 || 26 Jan 2020 || 210 || align=left | Disc.: AMOS || 
|- id="2003 CB26" bgcolor=#d6d6d6
| 0 ||  || MBA-O || 16.4 || 2.9 km || multiple || 2003–2020 || 20 Jun 2020 || 112 || align=left | Disc.: NEATAlt.: 2014 EG35 || 
|- id="2003 CH26" bgcolor=#E9E9E9
| 0 ||  || MBA-M || 17.33 || 1.4 km || multiple || 2003–2021 || 20 Apr 2021 || 73 || align=left | Disc.: AMOS || 
|- id="2003 CP26" bgcolor=#d6d6d6
| 0 ||  || MBA-O || 15.76 || 3.9 km || multiple || 2003–2021 || 30 Jun 2021 || 216 || align=left | Disc.: NEAT || 
|- id="2003 CQ26" bgcolor=#fefefe
| 0 ||  || MBA-I || 17.8 || data-sort-value="0.82" | 820 m || multiple || 2003–2020 || 15 Oct 2020 || 118 || align=left | Disc.: LPL/Spacewatch II || 
|- id="2003 CR26" bgcolor=#d6d6d6
| 0 ||  || MBA-O || 16.44 || 2.9 km || multiple || 2003–2021 || 12 May 2021 || 86 || align=left | Disc.: SDSS || 
|- id="2003 CS26" bgcolor=#fefefe
| 0 ||  || MBA-I || 17.3 || 1.0 km || multiple || 2003–2021 || 05 Jan 2021 || 108 || align=left | Disc.: Astrovirtel || 
|- id="2003 CV26" bgcolor=#E9E9E9
| 0 ||  || MBA-M || 16.82 || 2.4 km || multiple || 2003–2021 || 14 Apr 2021 || 135 || align=left | Disc.: NEAT || 
|- id="2003 CW26" bgcolor=#fefefe
| 0 ||  || MBA-I || 18.3 || data-sort-value="0.65" | 650 m || multiple || 2003–2021 || 18 Jan 2021 || 70 || align=left | Disc.: NEAT || 
|- id="2003 CZ26" bgcolor=#d6d6d6
| 0 ||  || MBA-O || 16.19 || 3.2 km || multiple || 2003–2021 || 15 Apr 2021 || 111 || align=left | Disc.: NEAT || 
|- id="2003 CA27" bgcolor=#d6d6d6
| 0 ||  || MBA-O || 16.5 || 2.8 km || multiple || 2003–2020 || 29 Feb 2020 || 59 || align=left | Disc.: SDSS || 
|- id="2003 CB27" bgcolor=#fefefe
| 0 ||  || MBA-I || 17.73 || data-sort-value="0.85" | 850 m || multiple || 1996–2021 || 05 May 2021 || 193 || align=left | Disc.: NEATAlt.: 2010 FY38 || 
|- id="2003 CC27" bgcolor=#d6d6d6
| 0 ||  || MBA-O || 15.8 || 3.9 km || multiple || 2003–2020 || 11 Nov 2020 || 107 || align=left | Disc.: SDSS || 
|- id="2003 CD27" bgcolor=#d6d6d6
| 0 ||  || MBA-O || 16.94 || 2.3 km || multiple || 2003–2021 || 08 Jun 2021 || 43 || align=left | Disc.: SDSS || 
|- id="2003 CE27" bgcolor=#E9E9E9
| 0 ||  || MBA-M || 17.5 || 1.3 km || multiple || 2003–2020 || 04 Jan 2020 || 58 || align=left | Disc.: SDSSAlt.: 2016 BV34 || 
|- id="2003 CF27" bgcolor=#d6d6d6
| 0 ||  || MBA-O || 17.15 || 2.1 km || multiple || 1995–2021 || 13 Jul 2021 || 64 || align=left | Disc.: SDSS || 
|- id="2003 CG27" bgcolor=#fefefe
| 0 ||  || MBA-I || 18.1 || data-sort-value="0.71" | 710 m || multiple || 2003–2021 || 17 Jan 2021 || 155 || align=left | Disc.: LPL/Spacewatch II || 
|- id="2003 CK27" bgcolor=#fefefe
| 1 ||  || HUN || 19.4 || data-sort-value="0.39" | 390 m || multiple || 2003–2018 || 06 Jan 2018 || 30 || align=left | Disc.: SDSS || 
|- id="2003 CL27" bgcolor=#d6d6d6
| 0 ||  || MBA-O || 16.6 || 2.7 km || multiple || 2003–2020 || 02 Feb 2020 || 37 || align=left | Disc.: SDSS || 
|- id="2003 CM27" bgcolor=#d6d6d6
| 0 ||  || MBA-O || 17.2 || 2.0 km || multiple || 2003–2019 || 05 Feb 2019 || 33 || align=left | Disc.: SDSS || 
|- id="2003 CN27" bgcolor=#E9E9E9
| 1 ||  || MBA-M || 18.2 || data-sort-value="0.96" | 960 m || multiple || 2003–2020 || 19 Jan 2020 || 30 || align=left | Disc.: Astrovirtel || 
|- id="2003 CO27" bgcolor=#E9E9E9
| 0 ||  || MBA-M || 17.9 || data-sort-value="0.78" | 780 m || multiple || 2003–2020 || 24 Mar 2020 || 26 || align=left | Disc.: SDSS || 
|- id="2003 CP27" bgcolor=#fefefe
| 1 ||  || MBA-I || 17.7 || data-sort-value="0.86" | 860 m || multiple || 2003–2019 || 22 Oct 2019 || 25 || align=left | Disc.: NEAT || 
|- id="2003 CR27" bgcolor=#E9E9E9
| 1 ||  || MBA-M || 17.5 || data-sort-value="0.94" | 940 m || multiple || 2003–2020 || 23 Jun 2020 || 59 || align=left | Disc.: SDSS || 
|- id="2003 CS27" bgcolor=#E9E9E9
| 0 ||  || MBA-M || 17.14 || 1.1 km || multiple || 2003–2021 || 05 Dec 2021 || 113 || align=left | Disc.: NEAT || 
|- id="2003 CT27" bgcolor=#d6d6d6
| 0 ||  || MBA-O || 16.4 || 2.9 km || multiple || 2003–2020 || 11 May 2020 || 54 || align=left | Disc.: SDSS || 
|- id="2003 CU27" bgcolor=#fefefe
| 0 ||  || MBA-I || 17.6 || data-sort-value="0.90" | 900 m || multiple || 2003–2020 || 08 Dec 2020 || 101 || align=left | Disc.: SDSS || 
|- id="2003 CV27" bgcolor=#d6d6d6
| 0 ||  || MBA-O || 16.9 || 2.3 km || multiple || 2003–2020 || 22 Apr 2020 || 45 || align=left | Disc.: SDSS || 
|- id="2003 CW27" bgcolor=#d6d6d6
| 0 ||  || MBA-O || 16.39 || 2.9 km || multiple || 2003–2021 || 12 May 2021 || 89 || align=left | Disc.: SDSSAlt.: 2010 CZ139, 2010 PC39 || 
|- id="2003 CY27" bgcolor=#fefefe
| 0 ||  || MBA-I || 18.3 || data-sort-value="0.65" | 650 m || multiple || 2003–2019 || 24 Oct 2019 || 34 || align=left | Disc.: SDSS || 
|- id="2003 CZ27" bgcolor=#fefefe
| 0 ||  || MBA-I || 18.86 || data-sort-value="0.50" | 500 m || multiple || 2003–2021 || 09 Nov 2021 || 35 || align=left | Disc.: SDSS || 
|- id="2003 CA28" bgcolor=#d6d6d6
| 0 ||  || MBA-O || 17.1 || 2.1 km || multiple || 2003–2019 || 11 Feb 2019 || 26 || align=left | Disc.: SDSS || 
|- id="2003 CB28" bgcolor=#E9E9E9
| 1 ||  || MBA-M || 17.4 || 1.8 km || multiple || 2003–2017 || 18 Mar 2017 || 21 || align=left | Disc.: SDSS || 
|- id="2003 CC28" bgcolor=#E9E9E9
| 0 ||  || MBA-M || 17.6 || 1.7 km || multiple || 2003–2021 || 04 Jan 2021 || 52 || align=left | Disc.: SDSS || 
|- id="2003 CD28" bgcolor=#d6d6d6
| 0 ||  || MBA-O || 17.19 || 2.0 km || multiple || 2003–2021 || 06 Apr 2021 || 39 || align=left | Disc.: SDSS || 
|- id="2003 CE28" bgcolor=#d6d6d6
| 0 ||  || MBA-O || 16.96 || 2.3 km || multiple || 2003–2021 || 08 May 2021 || 58 || align=left | Disc.: SDSS || 
|- id="2003 CG28" bgcolor=#d6d6d6
| 0 ||  || MBA-O || 16.62 || 2.6 km || multiple || 2003–2021 || 10 May 2021 || 66 || align=left | Disc.: SDSS || 
|- id="2003 CH28" bgcolor=#fefefe
| 0 ||  || MBA-I || 18.69 || data-sort-value="0.54" | 540 m || multiple || 2003–2021 || 04 Aug 2021 || 55 || align=left | Disc.: SDSS || 
|- id="2003 CJ28" bgcolor=#d6d6d6
| 0 ||  || MBA-O || 17.15 || 2.1 km || multiple || 2003–2021 || 18 Apr 2021 || 40 || align=left | Disc.: SDSS || 
|- id="2003 CK28" bgcolor=#E9E9E9
| 0 ||  || MBA-M || 16.8 || 1.8 km || multiple || 2003–2020 || 27 Apr 2020 || 77 || align=left | Disc.: LPL/Spacewatch IIAdded on 22 July 2020 || 
|- id="2003 CM28" bgcolor=#fefefe
| 2 ||  || MBA-I || 20.1 || data-sort-value="0.28" | 280 m || multiple || 2003–2020 || 02 Apr 2020 || 24 || align=left | Disc.: LPL/Spacewatch IIAdded on 9 March 2021 || 
|- id="2003 CO28" bgcolor=#fefefe
| 1 ||  || MBA-I || 18.3 || data-sort-value="0.65" | 650 m || multiple || 2003–2021 || 13 Apr 2021 || 52 || align=left | Disc.: LPL/Spacewatch IIAdded on 17 June 2021 || 
|}
back to top

D 

|- id="2003 DJ" bgcolor=#fefefe
| 2 || 2003 DJ || MBA-I || 18.6 || data-sort-value="0.57" | 570 m || multiple || 2003–2018 || 20 Apr 2018 || 48 || align=left | Disc.: NEAT || 
|- id="2003 DW" bgcolor=#E9E9E9
| 0 || 2003 DW || MBA-M || 16.45 || 2.9 km || multiple || 1994–2021 || 08 May 2021 || 230 || align=left | Disc.: NEATAlt.: 2012 CF8 || 
|- id="2003 DD2" bgcolor=#E9E9E9
| 0 ||  || MBA-M || 16.5 || 2.8 km || multiple || 2003–2021 || 06 Jan 2021 || 163 || align=left | Disc.: NEAT || 
|- id="2003 DJ2" bgcolor=#d6d6d6
| 0 ||  || MBA-O || 17.1 || 2.1 km || multiple || 2003–2019 || 08 Apr 2019 || 61 || align=left | Disc.: LPL/Spacewatch IIAlt.: 2008 BU || 
|- id="2003 DY2" bgcolor=#fefefe
| 0 ||  || MBA-I || 18.10 || data-sort-value="0.71" | 710 m || multiple || 2001–2021 || 27 Aug 2021 || 134 || align=left | Disc.: LPL/Spacewatch IIAlt.: 2014 QV51 || 
|- id="2003 DM4" bgcolor=#FA8072
| 3 ||  || MCA || 19.1 || data-sort-value="0.45" | 450 m || multiple || 2003–2007 || 15 May 2007 || 51 || align=left | Disc.: NEAT || 
|- id="2003 DJ5" bgcolor=#fefefe
| 0 ||  || MBA-I || 17.7 || data-sort-value="0.86" | 860 m || multiple || 2003–2020 || 06 Nov 2020 || 95 || align=left | Disc.: NEAT || 
|- id="2003 DF6" bgcolor=#FFC2E0
| 1 ||  || APO || 21.2 || data-sort-value="0.20" | 200 m || multiple || 2003–2007 || 17 Feb 2007 || 167 || align=left | Disc.: NEATAMO at MPC || 
|- id="2003 DG6" bgcolor=#FFC2E0
| 3 ||  || APO || 20.7 || data-sort-value="0.26" | 260 m || multiple || 2003–2020 || 24 Mar 2020 || 78 || align=left | Disc.: LINEAR || 
|- id="2003 DH6" bgcolor=#FFC2E0
| 6 ||  || APO || 24.3 || data-sort-value="0.049" | 49 m || single || 8 days || 03 Mar 2003 || 97 || align=left | Disc.: LONEOSAMO at MPC || 
|- id="2003 DP6" bgcolor=#E9E9E9
| 0 ||  || MBA-M || 16.61 || 2.0 km || multiple || 2003–2021 || 18 Apr 2021 || 141 || align=left | Disc.: CINEOS || 
|- id="2003 DR6" bgcolor=#d6d6d6
| 0 ||  || MBA-O || 15.87 || 3.7 km || multiple || 2003–2021 || 17 Apr 2021 || 121 || align=left | Disc.: CINEOSAlt.: 2013 YZ101 || 
|- id="2003 DS8" bgcolor=#E9E9E9
| 0 ||  || MBA-M || 16.9 || 2.3 km || multiple || 2000–2021 || 04 Jan 2021 || 126 || align=left | Disc.: NEATAlt.: 2010 VZ16 || 
|- id="2003 DA9" bgcolor=#fefefe
| 0 ||  || MBA-I || 18.53 || data-sort-value="0.58" | 580 m || multiple || 2003–2021 || 04 Jul 2021 || 69 || align=left | Disc.: LPL/Spacewatch IIAlt.: 2017 FR103 || 
|- id="2003 DQ10" bgcolor=#d6d6d6
| 0 ||  || MBA-O || 16.95 || 2.3 km || multiple || 2003–2019 || 29 Apr 2019 || 87 || align=left | Disc.: CINEOS || 
|- id="2003 DW10" bgcolor=#FFC2E0
| 4 ||  || APO || 26.1 || data-sort-value="0.021" | 21 m || single || 161 days || 06 Aug 2003 || 114 || align=left | Disc.: LINEAR || 
|- id="2003 DU15" bgcolor=#FA8072
| 0 ||  || MCA || 18.3 || data-sort-value="0.65" | 650 m || multiple || 1992–2018 || 09 May 2018 || 63 || align=left | Disc.: CINEOS || 
|- id="2003 DY15" bgcolor=#FFC2E0
| 6 ||  || APO || 26.3 || data-sort-value="0.020" | 20 m || single || 5 days || 05 Mar 2003 || 54 || align=left | Disc.: AMOS || 
|- id="2003 DZ15" bgcolor=#FFC2E0
| 0 ||  || APO || 22.3 || data-sort-value="0.12" | 120 m || multiple || 2003–2017 || 21 Jun 2017 || 191 || align=left | Disc.: AMOS || 
|- id="2003 DA16" bgcolor=#FFC2E0
| 1 ||  || APO || 17.8 || data-sort-value="0.98" | 980 m || multiple || 2002–2020 || 15 Apr 2020 || 142 || align=left | Disc.: LINEARNEO larger than 1 kilometer || 
|- id="2003 DB16" bgcolor=#fefefe
| – ||  || MBA-I || 19.6 || data-sort-value="0.36" | 360 m || single || 6 days || 28 Feb 2003 || 16 || align=left | Disc.: KLENOT || 
|- id="2003 DF16" bgcolor=#FFC2E0
| 0 ||  || APO || 20.08 || data-sort-value="0.34" | 340 m || multiple || 2003–2021 || 04 Nov 2021 || 133 || align=left | Disc.: LINEARAMO at MPC || 
|- id="2003 DZ20" bgcolor=#fefefe
| 1 ||  || HUN || 18.2 || data-sort-value="0.68" | 680 m || multiple || 2003–2020 || 30 Jul 2020 || 107 || align=left | Disc.: NEAT || 
|- id="2003 DG21" bgcolor=#E9E9E9
| 0 ||  || MBA-M || 16.7 || 1.9 km || multiple || 2003–2020 || 19 May 2020 || 140 || align=left | Disc.: LONEOS || 
|- id="2003 DV22" bgcolor=#fefefe
| 4 ||  || MBA-I || 18.7 || data-sort-value="0.54" | 540 m || multiple || 2003–2015 || 21 Aug 2015 || 19 || align=left | Disc.: Cerro TololoAdded on 21 August 2021 || 
|- id="2003 DG25" bgcolor=#fefefe
| 0 ||  || MBA-I || 17.9 || data-sort-value="0.78" | 780 m || multiple || 2003–2020 || 17 Nov 2020 || 92 || align=left | Disc.: NEAT || 
|- id="2003 DH25" bgcolor=#fefefe
| 0 ||  || MBA-I || 18.39 || data-sort-value="0.62" | 620 m || multiple || 2003–2021 || 14 Aug 2021 || 103 || align=left | Disc.: CINEOS || 
|- id="2003 DJ25" bgcolor=#E9E9E9
| 0 ||  || MBA-M || 17.9 || 1.1 km || multiple || 2003–2020 || 22 Mar 2020 || 82 || align=left | Disc.: NEAT || 
|- id="2003 DL25" bgcolor=#fefefe
| 1 ||  || MBA-I || 18.6 || data-sort-value="0.57" | 570 m || multiple || 2003–2018 || 19 Mar 2018 || 33 || align=left | Disc.: CINEOS || 
|- id="2003 DN25" bgcolor=#fefefe
| 0 ||  || HUN || 18.4 || data-sort-value="0.62" | 620 m || multiple || 2003–2020 || 14 Nov 2020 || 106 || align=left | Disc.: NEAT || 
|- id="2003 DO25" bgcolor=#E9E9E9
| 0 ||  || MBA-M || 17.0 || 1.7 km || multiple || 2003–2020 || 11 Apr 2020 || 100 || align=left | Disc.: LPL/Spacewatch II || 
|- id="2003 DP25" bgcolor=#d6d6d6
| 0 ||  || MBA-O || 16.70 || 2.5 km || multiple || 2003–2022 || 25 Jan 2022 || 97 || align=left | Disc.: CINEOS || 
|- id="2003 DQ25" bgcolor=#E9E9E9
| 0 ||  || MBA-M || 17.64 || 1.7 km || multiple || 2003–2021 || 12 May 2021 || 93 || align=left | Disc.: CINEOS || 
|- id="2003 DR25" bgcolor=#fefefe
| 0 ||  || MBA-I || 17.9 || data-sort-value="0.78" | 780 m || multiple || 2003–2020 || 23 Mar 2020 || 81 || align=left | Disc.: NEAT || 
|- id="2003 DS25" bgcolor=#E9E9E9
| 0 ||  || MBA-M || 17.5 || 1.3 km || multiple || 2003–2020 || 16 Mar 2020 || 49 || align=left | Disc.: CINEOSAdded on 22 July 2020 || 
|- id="2003 DT25" bgcolor=#fefefe
| 1 ||  || MBA-I || 17.9 || data-sort-value="0.78" | 780 m || multiple || 2001–2021 || 13 May 2021 || 116 || align=left | Disc.: NEATAdded on 9 March 2021Alt.: 2010 GZ184 || 
|- id="2003 DU25" bgcolor=#FFC2E0
| 9 ||  || AMO || 25.23 || data-sort-value="0.032" | 32 m || single || 1 day || 25 Feb 2003 || 10 || align=left | Disc.: Mauna Kea Obs.Added on 21 August 2021 || 
|- id="2003 DV25" bgcolor=#d6d6d6
| 0 ||  || MBA-O || 17.87 || 1.5 km || multiple || 2003–2020 || 29 Feb 2020 || 57 || align=left | Disc.: Mauna Kea Obs.Added on 21 August 2021 || 
|}
back to top

E 

|- id="2003 EM1" bgcolor=#FFC2E0
| 4 ||  || ATE || 24.5 || data-sort-value="0.045" | 45 m || single || 8 days || 13 Mar 2003 || 227 || align=left | Disc.: Črni Vrh Obs. || 
|- id="2003 EN1" bgcolor=#E9E9E9
| 0 ||  || MBA-M || 16.8 || 1.8 km || multiple || 2003–2020 || 22 Apr 2020 || 150 || align=left | Disc.: LINEARAlt.: 2014 YJ || 
|- id="2003 EP4" bgcolor=#FFC2E0
| 0 ||  || APO || 23.92 || data-sort-value="0.058" | 58 m || multiple || 2003–2009 || 09 Nov 2009 || 83 || align=left | Disc.: LINEAR || 
|- id="2003 EG5" bgcolor=#E9E9E9
| 1 ||  || MBA-M || 17.2 || 1.5 km || multiple || 2003–2020 || 22 May 2020 || 132 || align=left | Disc.: AMOS || 
|- id="2003 EX13" bgcolor=#d6d6d6
| 0 ||  || MBA-O || 16.95 || 2.3 km || multiple || 2003–2021 || 13 Sep 2021 || 201 || align=left | Disc.: NEATAdded on 22 July 2020Alt.: 2020 FT7 || 
|- id="2003 EG16" bgcolor=#FFC2E0
| 0 ||  || APO || 19.3 || data-sort-value="0.49" | 490 m || multiple || 2003–2014 || 16 Sep 2014 || 137 || align=left | Disc.: LINEARPotentially hazardous object || 
|- id="2003 EH16" bgcolor=#FFC2E0
| 0 ||  || AMO || 20.39 || data-sort-value="0.30" | 300 m || multiple || 2003–2021 || 09 Apr 2021 || 176 || align=left | Disc.: NEAT || 
|- id="2003 EP16" bgcolor=#FFC2E0
| 6 ||  || AMO || 23.0 || data-sort-value="0.089" | 89 m || single || 21 days || 30 Mar 2003 || 31 || align=left | Disc.: LPL/Spacewatch II || 
|- id="2003 EQ16" bgcolor=#fefefe
| – ||  || MBA-I || 17.8 || data-sort-value="0.82" | 820 m || single || 20 days || 26 Mar 2003 || 10 || align=left | Disc.: LONEOS || 
|- id="2003 EZ16" bgcolor=#FFC2E0
| 2 ||  || APO || 22.6 || data-sort-value="0.11" | 110 m || multiple || 2003–2017 || 18 Mar 2017 || 105 || align=left | Disc.: SpacewatchAMO at MPC || 
|- id="2003 ED17" bgcolor=#FA8072
| 0 ||  || MCA || 17.43 || 1.4 km || multiple || 2000–2021 || 02 Oct 2021 || 196 || align=left | Disc.: LINEAR || 
|- id="2003 EH18" bgcolor=#d6d6d6
| 0 ||  || MBA-O || 15.68 || 4.1 km || multiple || 2003–2021 || 07 Jul 2021 || 206 || align=left | Disc.: LONEOSAlt.: 2014 CL21 || 
|- id="2003 EW23" bgcolor=#fefefe
| 0 ||  || MBA-I || 17.58 || data-sort-value="0.91" | 910 m || multiple || 1996–2021 || 09 May 2021 || 158 || align=left | Disc.: LINEARAlt.: 2012 TO220 || 
|- id="2003 EC31" bgcolor=#E9E9E9
| 0 ||  || MBA-M || 16.2 || 3.2 km || multiple || 2003–2021 || 16 Jan 2021 || 166 || align=left | Disc.: NEATAlt.: 2012 BB18 || 
|- id="2003 EM31" bgcolor=#E9E9E9
| 0 ||  || MBA-M || 16.9 || 1.8 km || multiple || 2003–2020 || 22 Mar 2020 || 91 || align=left | Disc.: LPL/Spacewatch IIAlt.: 2016 CB209 || 
|- id="2003 EM36" bgcolor=#E9E9E9
| 0 ||  || MBA-M || 17.43 || 1.4 km || multiple || 2003–2021 || 06 Oct 2021 || 126 || align=left | Disc.: LONEOS || 
|- id="2003 EN38" bgcolor=#E9E9E9
| 0 ||  || MBA-M || 15.9 || 2.8 km || multiple || 2003–2021 || 12 Jun 2021 || 324 || align=left | Disc.: LONEOSAlt.: 2010 VU49 || 
|- id="2003 EM42" bgcolor=#fefefe
| 0 ||  || MBA-I || 18.73 || data-sort-value="0.53" | 530 m || multiple || 2003–2021 || 12 Jun 2021 || 83 || align=left | Disc.: LPL/Spacewatch II || 
|- id="2003 EV42" bgcolor=#fefefe
| 2 ||  || MBA-I || 19.1 || data-sort-value="0.45" | 450 m || multiple || 2003–2020 || 23 Jan 2020 || 38 || align=left | Disc.: LPL/Spacewatch IIAlt.: 2010 GQ139 || 
|- id="2003 ER43" bgcolor=#E9E9E9
| 0 ||  || MBA-M || 16.5 || 2.1 km || multiple || 2003–2021 || 15 Jun 2021 || 163 || align=left | Disc.: LINEARAlt.: 2012 HL15 || 
|- id="2003 EV46" bgcolor=#E9E9E9
| 0 ||  || MBA-M || 18.2 || data-sort-value="0.96" | 960 m || multiple || 2003–2020 || 22 Apr 2020 || 73 || align=left | Disc.: LPL/Spacewatch IIAdded on 22 July 2020 || 
|- id="2003 EA50" bgcolor=#FA8072
| 0 ||  || MCA || 17.7 || data-sort-value="0.86" | 860 m || multiple || 2003–2019 || 25 Oct 2019 || 207 || align=left | Disc.: LONEOSAlt.: 2011 RQ, 2011 SW45 || 
|- id="2003 EC50" bgcolor=#FFC2E0
| 2 ||  || APO || 22.9 || data-sort-value="0.093" | 93 m || single || 13 days || 23 Mar 2003 || 34 || align=left | Disc.: NEAT || 
|- id="2003 EZ50" bgcolor=#fefefe
| 1 ||  || MBA-I || 18.4 || data-sort-value="0.62" | 620 m || multiple || 2003–2019 || 20 Dec 2019 || 67 || align=left | Disc.: NEATAlt.: 2017 FJ76 || 
|- id="2003 EH51" bgcolor=#FA8072
| – ||  || HUN || 22.3 || data-sort-value="0.10" | 100 m || single || 5 days || 13 Mar 2003 || 9 || align=left | Disc.: Spacewatch || 
|- id="2003 EJ51" bgcolor=#d6d6d6
| 0 ||  || MBA-O || 16.1 || 3.4 km || multiple || 2003–2020 || 21 May 2020 || 86 || align=left | Disc.: NEATAlt.: 2014 FQ14 || 
|- id="2003 EK51" bgcolor=#E9E9E9
| 2 ||  || MBA-M || 17.9 || 1.1 km || multiple || 2003–2020 || 20 May 2020 || 42 || align=left | Disc.: NEAT || 
|- id="2003 EX53" bgcolor=#fefefe
| 1 ||  || HUN || 18.8 || data-sort-value="0.52" | 520 m || multiple || 2003–2018 || 01 Nov 2018 || 50 || align=left | Disc.: Tenagra II Obs. || 
|- id="2003 EJ54" bgcolor=#E9E9E9
| 0 ||  || MBA-M || 18.4 || data-sort-value="0.88" | 880 m || multiple || 2003–2020 || 02 Feb 2020 || 60 || align=left | Disc.: Kitt Peak Obs.Alt.: 2010 TV11 || 
|- id="2003 EV54" bgcolor=#E9E9E9
| 0 ||  || MBA-M || 17.3 || 1.5 km || multiple || 2003–2020 || 24 Mar 2020 || 75 || align=left | Disc.: Kitt Peak Obs. || 
|- id="2003 EW54" bgcolor=#E9E9E9
| 0 ||  || MBA-M || 18.59 || data-sort-value="0.80" | 800 m || multiple || 2003–2021 || 30 Jun 2021 || 42 || align=left | Disc.: Kitt Peak Obs.Added on 22 July 2020 || 
|- id="2003 EX54" bgcolor=#d6d6d6
| 0 ||  || MBA-O || 16.9 || 2.3 km || multiple || 2003–2019 || 08 Jan 2019 || 53 || align=left | Disc.: Kitt Peak Obs. || 
|- id="2003 EZ54" bgcolor=#d6d6d6
| 5 ||  || MBA-O || 18.1 || 1.3 km || multiple || 2003–2016 || 28 Oct 2016 || 44 || align=left | Disc.: Kitt Peak Obs.Added on 30 September 2021Alt.: 2016 UJ210 || 
|- id="2003 EK55" bgcolor=#fefefe
| 0 ||  || MBA-I || 17.9 || data-sort-value="0.78" | 780 m || multiple || 2003–2021 || 11 Jun 2021 || 114 || align=left | Disc.: Kitt Peak Obs. || 
|- id="2003 EM56" bgcolor=#E9E9E9
| 1 ||  || MBA-M || 17.6 || 1.3 km || multiple || 2003–2020 || 13 Aug 2020 || 211 || align=left | Disc.: NEATAlt.: 2020 EL || 
|- id="2003 EP56" bgcolor=#fefefe
| 0 ||  || MBA-I || 19.03 || data-sort-value="0.46" | 460 m || multiple || 2000–2021 || 10 May 2021 || 65 || align=left | Disc.: Cerro Tololo || 
|- id="2003 EW56" bgcolor=#FA8072
| 0 ||  || MCA || 18.39 || data-sort-value="0.62" | 620 m || multiple || 2003–2022 || 24 Jan 2022 || 181 || align=left | Disc.: LONEOS || 
|- id="2003 EJ59" bgcolor=#FFC2E0
| 4 ||  || AMO || 19.9 || data-sort-value="0.37" | 370 m || single || 40 days || 21 Apr 2003 || 166 || align=left | Disc.: LINEAR || 
|- id="2003 EW59" bgcolor=#FFC2E0
| 7 ||  || APO || 23.3 || data-sort-value="0.078" | 78 m || single || 14 days || 26 Mar 2003 || 45 || align=left | Disc.: LINEAR || 
|- id="2003 EH62" bgcolor=#E9E9E9
| 0 ||  || MBA-M || 16.8 || 1.8 km || multiple || 2001–2020 || 11 May 2020 || 197 || align=left | Disc.: LONEOS || 
|- id="2003 EN63" bgcolor=#fefefe
| 0 ||  || MBA-I || 17.7 || data-sort-value="0.86" | 860 m || multiple || 2003–2021 || 07 Jun 2021 || 133 || align=left | Disc.: NEAT || 
|- id="2003 EP63" bgcolor=#d6d6d6
| 0 ||  || MBA-O || 16.9 || 2.3 km || multiple || 2003–2020 || 25 Mar 2020 || 67 || align=left | Disc.: LPL/Spacewatch II || 
|- id="2003 EX63" bgcolor=#fefefe
| 0 ||  || MBA-I || 17.51 || data-sort-value="0.94" | 940 m || multiple || 2003–2021 || 11 May 2021 || 131 || align=left | Disc.: LONEOS || 
|- id="2003 EA64" bgcolor=#E9E9E9
| 0 ||  || MBA-M || 17.49 || 1.3 km || multiple || 2003–2021 || 11 Sep 2021 || 45 || align=left | Disc.: LPL/Spacewatch IIAdded on 21 August 2021 || 
|- id="2003 EC64" bgcolor=#E9E9E9
| 0 ||  || MBA-M || 16.7 || 2.5 km || multiple || 2003–2019 || 18 Nov 2019 || 71 || align=left | Disc.: LPL/Spacewatch II || 
|- id="2003 ED64" bgcolor=#d6d6d6
| 0 ||  || HIL || 15.9 || 3.7 km || multiple || 1995–2020 || 22 Jun 2020 || 71 || align=left | Disc.: LPL/Spacewatch IIAlt.: 2010 DX87 || 
|- id="2003 EF64" bgcolor=#d6d6d6
| 0 ||  || MBA-O || 16.6 || 2.7 km || multiple || 2003–2020 || 08 Oct 2020 || 99 || align=left | Disc.: LPL/Spacewatch II || 
|- id="2003 EJ64" bgcolor=#d6d6d6
| 0 ||  || MBA-O || 16.1 || 3.4 km || multiple || 2003–2020 || 20 May 2020 || 72 || align=left | Disc.: SDSS || 
|- id="2003 EL64" bgcolor=#fefefe
| 0 ||  || MBA-I || 17.65 || data-sort-value="0.88" | 880 m || multiple || 2003–2021 || 07 Aug 2021 || 99 || align=left | Disc.: NEAT || 
|- id="2003 EM64" bgcolor=#fefefe
| 0 ||  || MBA-I || 18.57 || data-sort-value="0.57" | 570 m || multiple || 2003–2021 || 05 Jul 2021 || 88 || align=left | Disc.: LPL/Spacewatch II || 
|- id="2003 EN64" bgcolor=#fefefe
| 0 ||  || MBA-I || 18.0 || data-sort-value="0.75" | 750 m || multiple || 2003–2020 || 11 Dec 2020 || 77 || align=left | Disc.: LPL/Spacewatch II || 
|- id="2003 EO64" bgcolor=#fefefe
| 0 ||  || HUN || 18.2 || data-sort-value="0.68" | 680 m || multiple || 2003–2021 || 01 Jun 2021 || 129 || align=left | Disc.: LONEOSAlt.: 2016 HC || 
|- id="2003 EQ64" bgcolor=#fefefe
| 0 ||  || MBA-I || 18.5 || data-sort-value="0.59" | 590 m || multiple || 2003–2021 || 18 Jan 2021 || 61 || align=left | Disc.: LPL/Spacewatch II || 
|- id="2003 ER64" bgcolor=#fefefe
| 3 ||  || MBA-I || 18.7 || data-sort-value="0.54" | 540 m || multiple || 2003–2017 || 27 Mar 2017 || 28 || align=left | Disc.: LPL/Spacewatch II || 
|- id="2003 ET64" bgcolor=#d6d6d6
| 0 ||  || MBA-O || 16.2 || 3.2 km || multiple || 1997–2020 || 17 May 2020 || 95 || align=left | Disc.: NEAT || 
|- id="2003 EU64" bgcolor=#fefefe
| 0 ||  || MBA-I || 18.55 || data-sort-value="0.58" | 580 m || multiple || 2001–2021 || 18 Apr 2021 || 76 || align=left | Disc.: LPL/Spacewatch II || 
|- id="2003 EV64" bgcolor=#d6d6d6
| 0 ||  || MBA-O || 16.5 || 2.8 km || multiple || 2003–2020 || 25 Mar 2020 || 62 || align=left | Disc.: LPL/Spacewatch II || 
|- id="2003 EX64" bgcolor=#d6d6d6
| 0 ||  || MBA-O || 16.8 || 2.4 km || multiple || 2003–2020 || 26 Apr 2020 || 56 || align=left | Disc.: Kitt Peak Obs. || 
|- id="2003 EY64" bgcolor=#E9E9E9
| 0 ||  || MBA-M || 17.79 || data-sort-value="0.82" | 820 m || multiple || 2003–2021 || 08 Aug 2021 || 50 || align=left | Disc.: NEAT || 
|- id="2003 EZ64" bgcolor=#E9E9E9
| 0 ||  || MBA-M || 17.04 || 1.2 km || multiple || 2003–2021 || 19 Aug 2021 || 66 || align=left | Disc.: LPL/Spacewatch IIAlt.: 2010 FN105 || 
|- id="2003 EA65" bgcolor=#d6d6d6
| 0 ||  || MBA-O || 17.3 || 1.9 km || multiple || 2003–2019 || 04 Mar 2019 || 38 || align=left | Disc.: LPL/Spacewatch II || 
|- id="2003 EB65" bgcolor=#E9E9E9
| 0 ||  || MBA-M || 17.82 || data-sort-value="0.81" | 810 m || multiple || 2003–2021 || 08 Sep 2021 || 51 || align=left | Disc.: NEAT || 
|- id="2003 EC65" bgcolor=#fefefe
| 0 ||  || MBA-I || 17.34 || 1.0 km || multiple || 2003–2021 || 31 May 2021 || 56 || align=left | Disc.: SDSS || 
|- id="2003 ED65" bgcolor=#E9E9E9
| 0 ||  || MBA-M || 17.3 || 1.9 km || multiple || 2003–2019 || 27 Sep 2019 || 36 || align=left | Disc.: LPL/Spacewatch II || 
|- id="2003 EE65" bgcolor=#fefefe
| 0 ||  || MBA-I || 18.3 || data-sort-value="0.65" | 650 m || multiple || 2003–2020 || 18 Dec 2020 || 47 || align=left | Disc.: NEAT || 
|- id="2003 EF65" bgcolor=#fefefe
| 1 ||  || HUN || 18.8 || data-sort-value="0.52" | 520 m || multiple || 2003–2019 || 09 Feb 2019 || 22 || align=left | Disc.: SDSS || 
|- id="2003 EH65" bgcolor=#d6d6d6
| 0 ||  || MBA-O || 16.29 || 3.1 km || multiple || 2003–2021 || 28 Oct 2021 || 113 || align=left | Disc.: SDSS || 
|- id="2003 EJ65" bgcolor=#d6d6d6
| 1 ||  || MBA-O || 16.9 || 2.3 km || multiple || 2003–2019 || 08 Apr 2019 || 35 || align=left | Disc.: LONEOS || 
|- id="2003 EK65" bgcolor=#E9E9E9
| 1 ||  || MBA-M || 16.7 || 2.5 km || multiple || 2003–2019 || 31 Dec 2019 || 56 || align=left | Disc.: LPL/Spacewatch II || 
|- id="2003 EM65" bgcolor=#fefefe
| 0 ||  || MBA-I || 18.74 || data-sort-value="0.53" | 530 m || multiple || 2003–2021 || 08 May 2021 || 71 || align=left | Disc.: Kitt Peak Obs.Added on 22 July 2020 || 
|- id="2003 EN65" bgcolor=#FA8072
| 1 ||  || MCA || 17.3 || 1.9 km || multiple || 2003–2020 || 15 Oct 2020 || 62 || align=left | Disc.: CINEOSAdded on 19 October 2020 || 
|- id="2003 EO65" bgcolor=#FA8072
| 0 ||  || MCA || 20.70 || data-sort-value="0.22" | 220 m || multiple || 2003–2021 || 27 Dec 2021 || 26 || align=left | Disc.: LPL/Spacewatch IIAdded on 17 January 2021 || 
|- id="2003 EQ65" bgcolor=#fefefe
| 0 ||  || MBA-I || 18.8 || data-sort-value="0.52" | 520 m || multiple || 2003–2021 || 08 May 2021 || 51 || align=left | Disc.: LPL/Spacewatch IIAdded on 30 September 2021 || 
|}
back to top

References 
 

Lists of unnumbered minor planets